= Zaria =

City in Kaduna State, Nigeria

Zaria Birnin Zariya/Zaria (Hausa)
- City
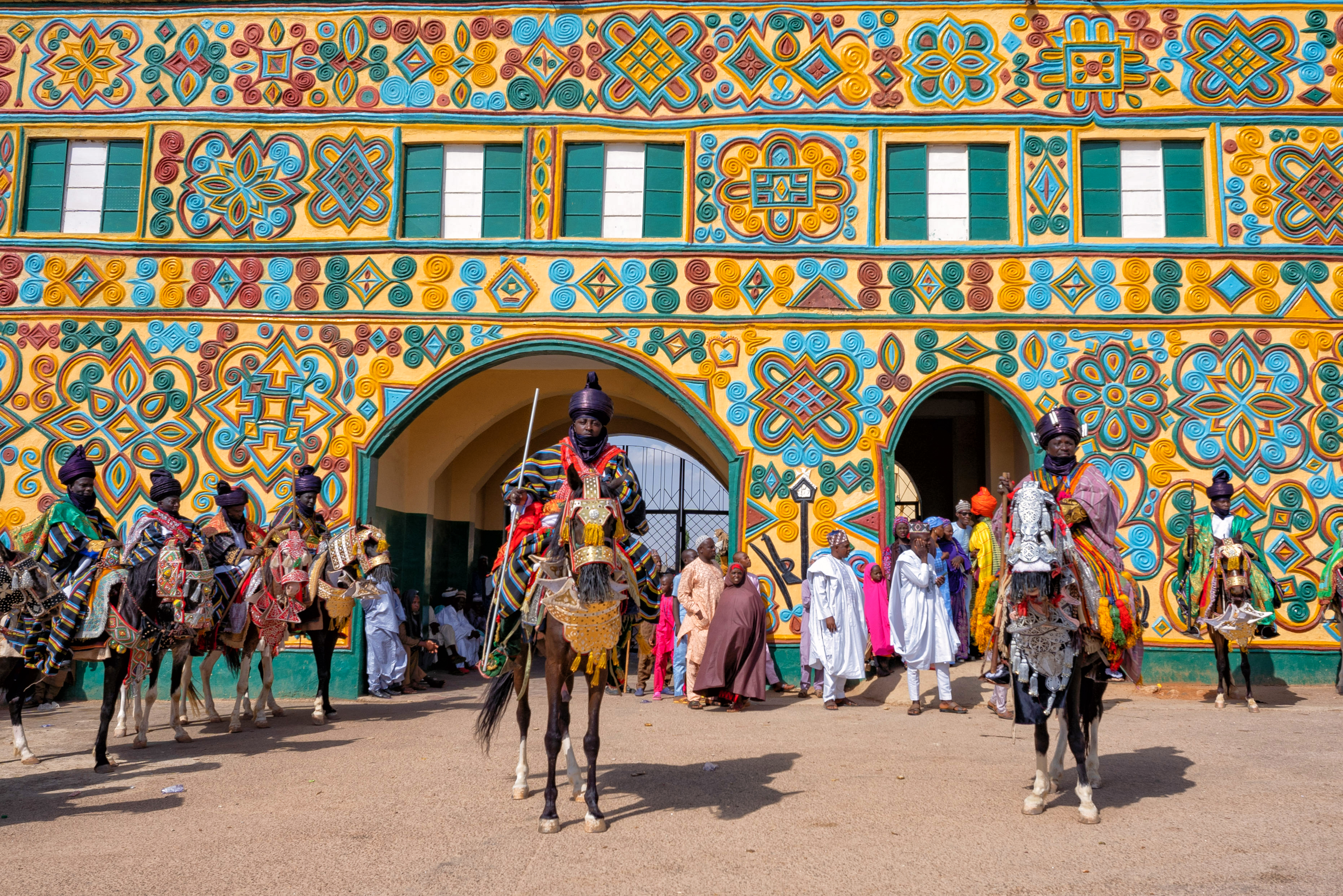
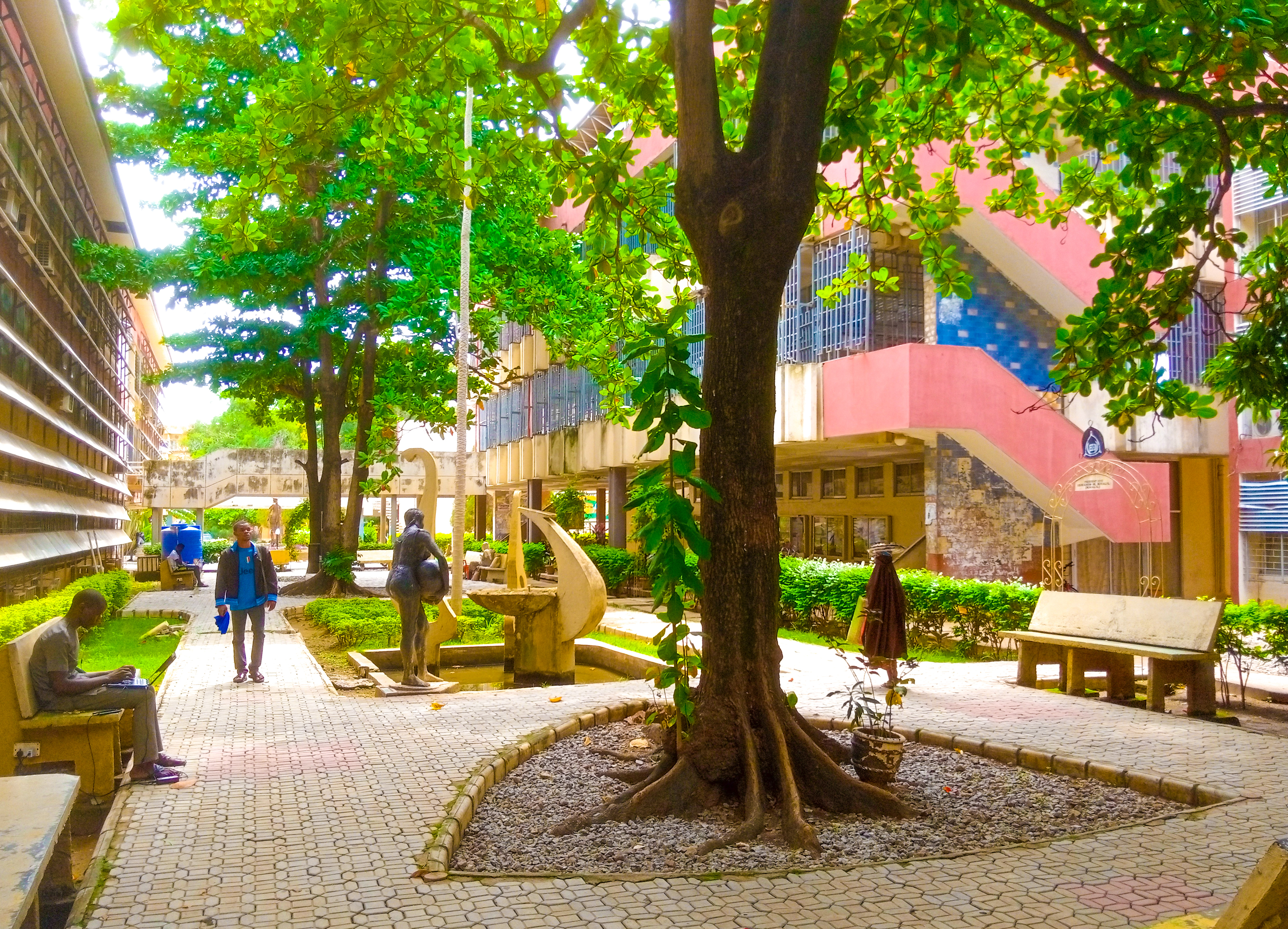
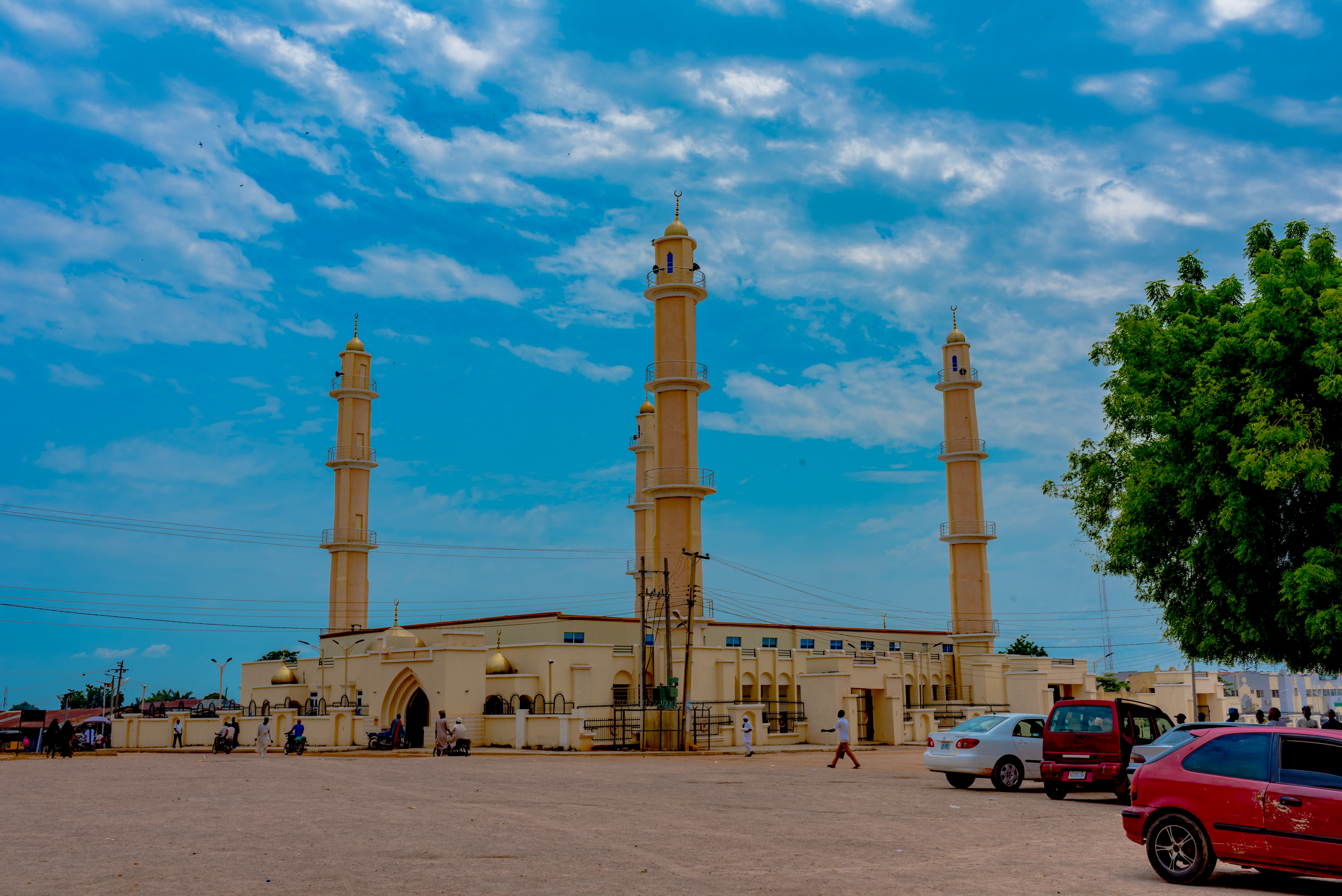
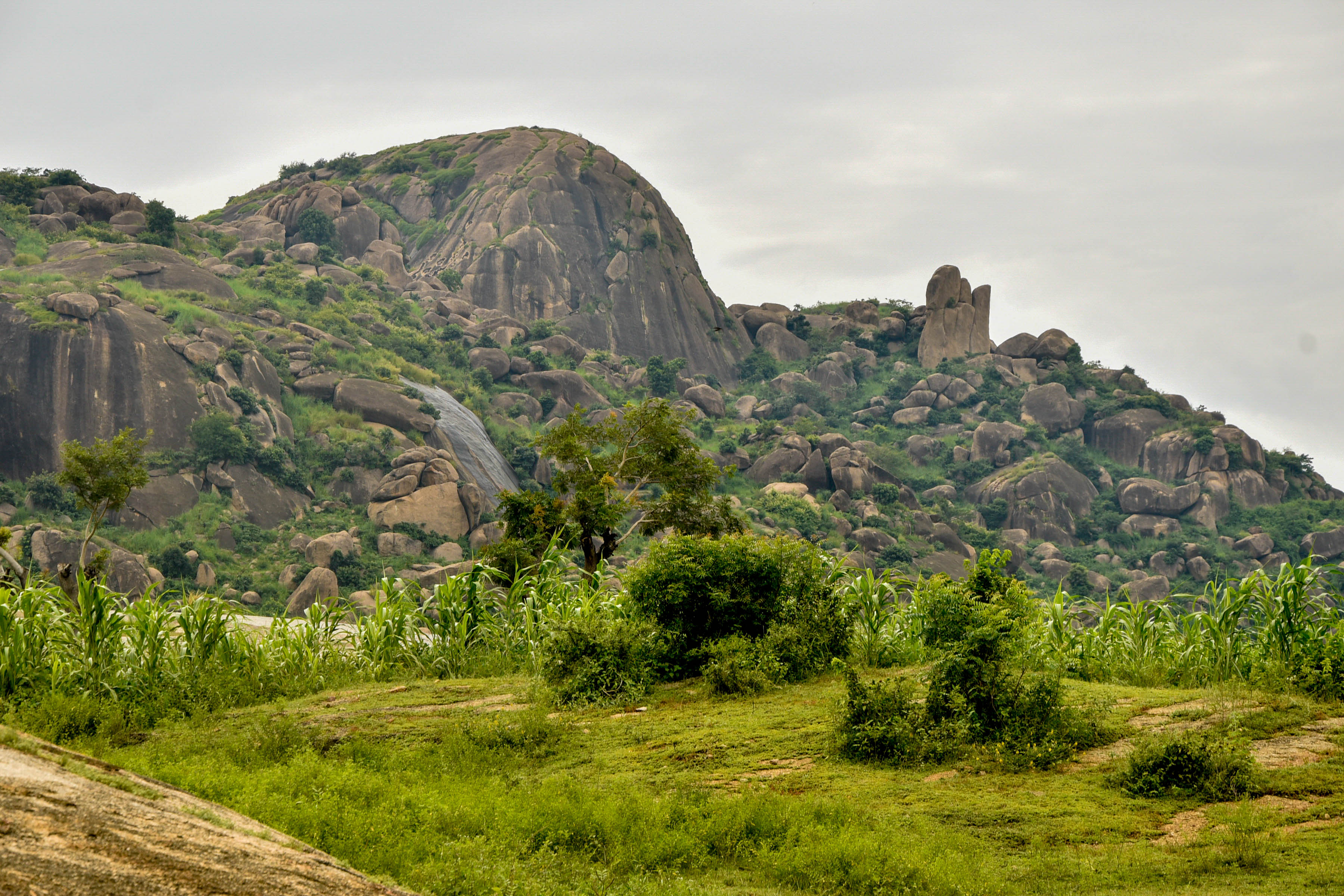
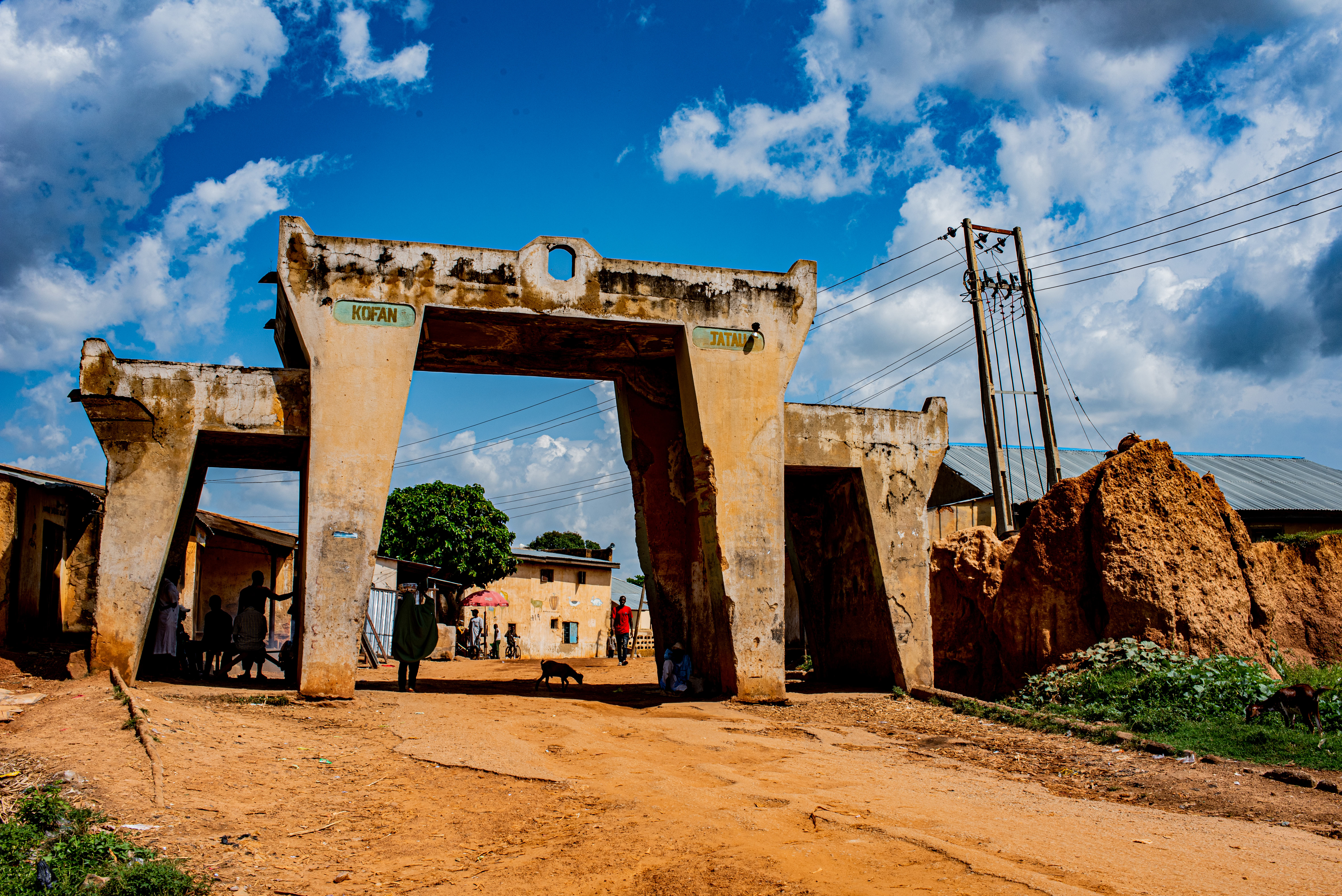
- Zazzau Emir's Palace Gate Ahmadu Bello University Central Mosque Kufena Rock Kofan Tatau Gate & City Wall

- Flag
- Nickname: Zazzau
- Motto: Birnin Ilimi
- Interactive map of Zaria
- Location within Nigeria
- Coordinates: 11°04′N 7°42′E
- Country: Nigeria
- State: Kaduna State
- LGAs: Giwa; Sabon Gari; Soba; Zaria
- Established: c. 1536 or earlier
- Founder: Hausa people

Area
  - Total: 563 km^{2} (217 sq mi)

Population (2023)
  - Total: 766,007
  - Density: 1,360/km^{2} (3,520/sq mi)
- Time zone: UTC+01:00 (WAT)
- Climate: Aw

Zaria (formerly Zazzau) is a metropolitan city in Nigeria, located within four local government areas in Kaduna State. It serves as the capital of the Zazzau Emirate Council and is one of the original seven Hausa city-states. The local government areas comprising Zaria are Zaria, Sabon Gari, Giwa, and Soba local government areas of Kaduna State, Nigeria.

It contains Nigeria's largest university, Ahmadu Bello University, and various tertiary institutions including the Federal College of Education (FCE Zaria), Nigerian College of Aviation Technology, Nigerian Institute of Transport Technology, Nigeria Institute of Leather and Science Technology and Nuhu Bamalli Polytechnic. Department of Agriculture Ahmed Bello University Zaria. Ameer Shehu Idris College of Advanced Diploma.

From the 2006 population census, Zaria was estimated to have 736,000 people. It is home to the Emir of Zazzau.

== History ==
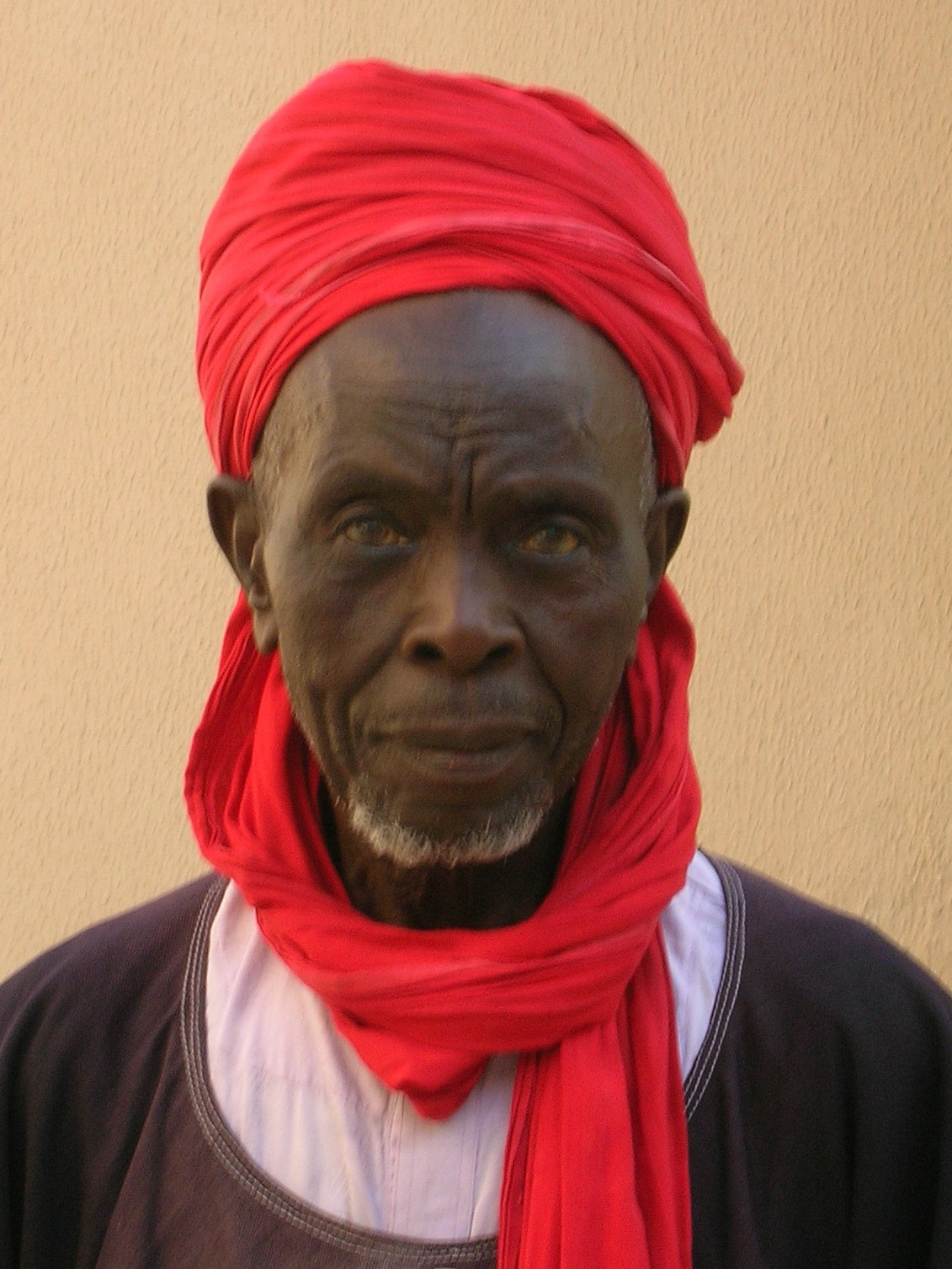
Guard at the palace of the emir

Zaria, initially known as Zazzau, was the capital of the Hausa kingdom of Zazzau. Zazzau is thought to have been founded in or about 1536 and in the late 16th century it was renamed after Queen Amina's sister, Zaria. Human settlement predates the rise of Zazzau, as the region, like some of its neighbors, had a history of sedentary Hausa settlement, with institutional market exchange and farming.

Zaria was the most southern of the Hausa city-states. It was a trading destination for Saharan caravans as well as a prominent city in the Hausa slave trade. In the late 1450s, Islam arrived in Zaria by the way of its sister Habe cities, Kano and Katsina. Along with Islam, trade flourished between the cities as traders brought camel caravans filled with salt in exchange for slaves and grain. The city-state's power peaked under Queen Amina whose military campaigns established a tributary region including the kingdoms of Kano and Katsina. At the end of the 16th century, after Queen Amina's death, Zaria fell under the influence of the Jukun Kingdom and eventually became a tributary state itself. Between the fifteenth and sixteenth century the kingdom became a tributary state of the Songhai Empire. In 1805 it was captured by the Fulani during the Fulani Jihad. British forces led by Frederick Lugard took the city in 1901.

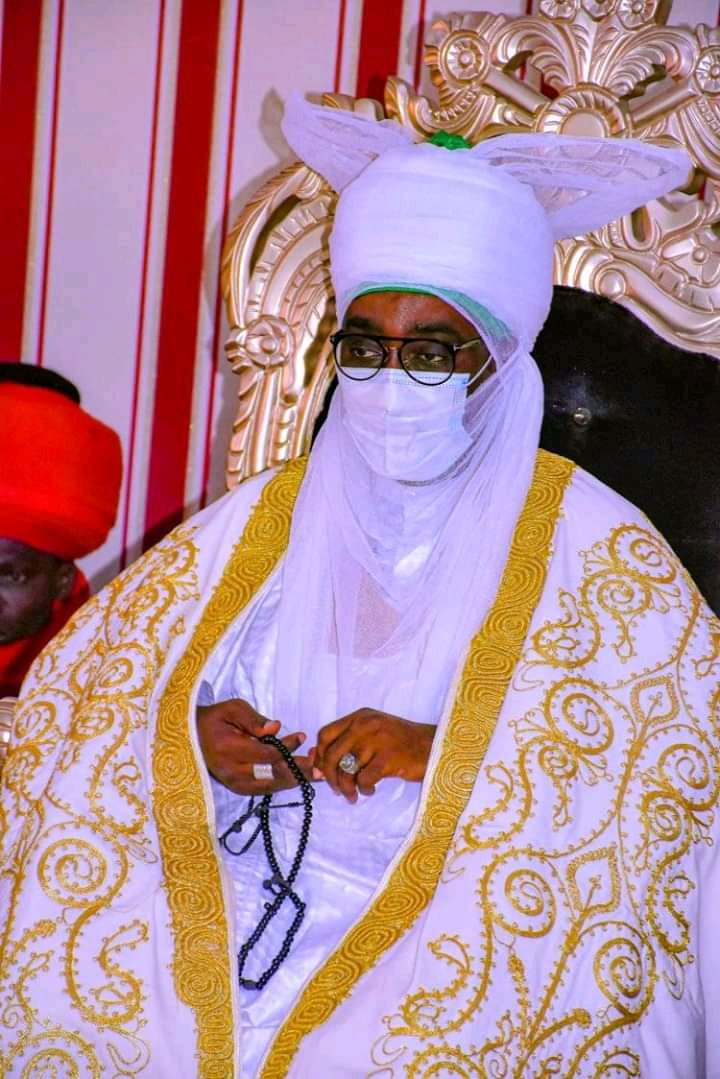
Emir of Zazzau AMB. Alh. Ahmed Nuhu Bamalli

A French hostage of the Islamist group Ansaru, held captive at Zaria, escaped in 2013 and reached a police station in the city.

In December 2015, Nigeria's military was reported to have killed 300 Shia Muslims and buried their bodies in a mass grave, following their physical attack and blockade of the Chief of Army Staff, General Tukur Yusuf Burtai in an area they claimed to own as they don't recognize the leadership of the Republic of Nigeria. Although the government denies the killing part, it has been described as a massacre.

== Cityscape ==
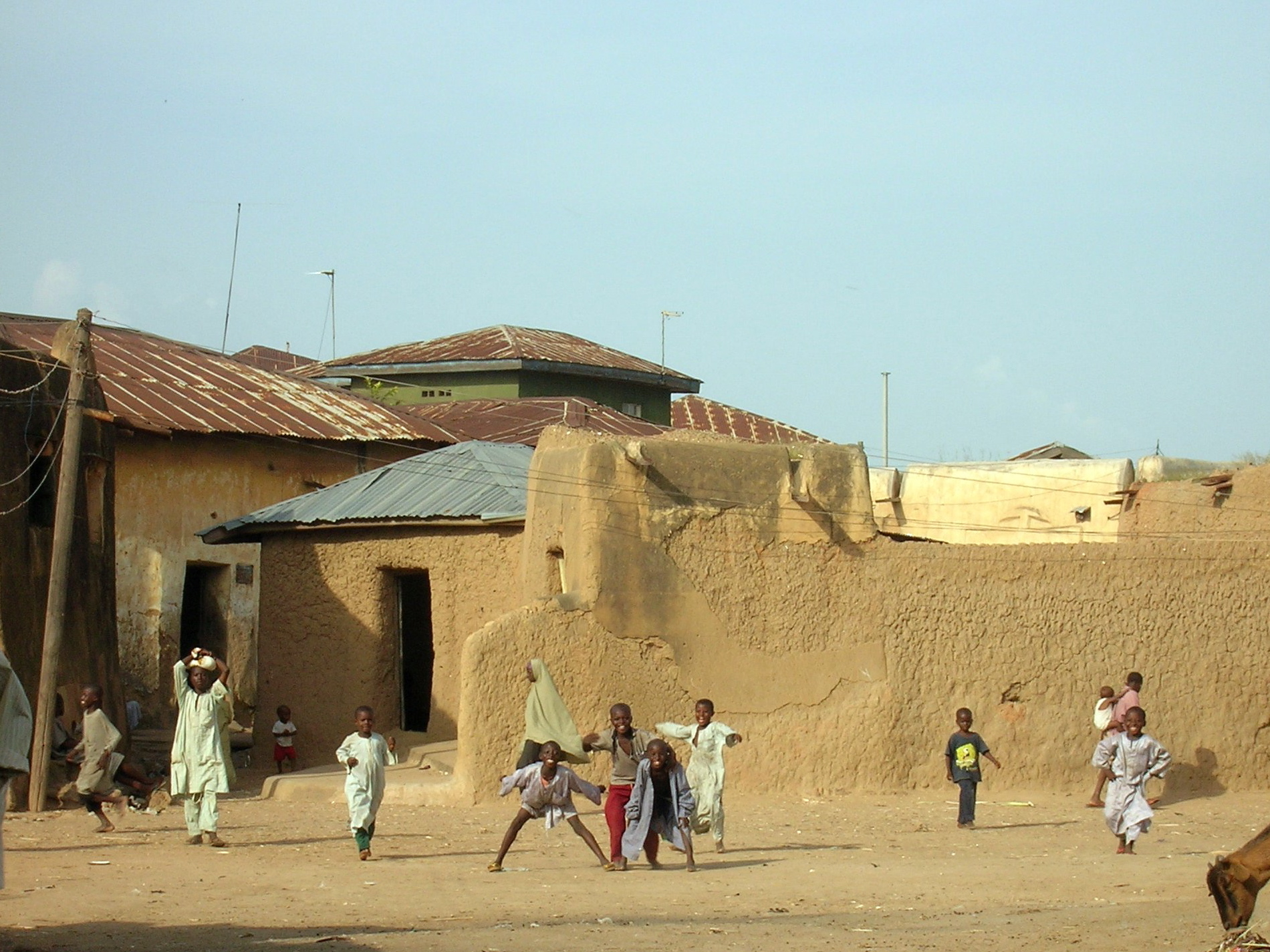
Children playing in one of the streets of Zaria

The old part of the city, known as Birnin Zazzau or Zaria City, was originally surrounded by walls and fortress, which have been mostly removed. The Emir's palace is in the old city. In the old city and the adjacent Tudun Wada neighbourhood people typically reside in traditional adobe compounds. These two neighborhoods are predominantly occupied by the indigenous Hausa.

There is great variety in the architecture of Zaria, with buildings made of clay in the Hausa style juxtaposed with modern, multi-storied university and government buildings.

Silk-cotton tree is one of the largest trees in Zazzau emirate generally and the tree has played an important role in the spiritual and economic lives of the peoples who live in Zaria especially people of Anguwan Kahu who makes Kahu for the Emirs, district heads, ward heads and village heads. silk-cotton-tree-scientific-name-is-ceiba-pentandra-under-blue-sky.

Anguwan Kahu was known to be a place of business where it use cotton to make local mattresses, pillows, Horse shirts etc.

Wakilin Kahu Zazzau is the head of Anguwan Kahu people and their representative at the emir's palace.

The ward of Anguwan Liman is located north of the Zaria palace.

== Transport and economy ==
Zaria's economy is primarily based on agriculture. Staples are guinea corn and millet. Cash crops include cotton, groundnuts and tobacco. Not only is Zaria a market town for the surrounding area, it is the home of artisans from traditional crafts like leather work, dyeing and cap making, to tinkers, printshops and furniture makers. Zaria is also the center of a textile industry that for over 200 years has made elaborately hand-embroidered robes that are worn by men throughout Nigeria and West Africa.

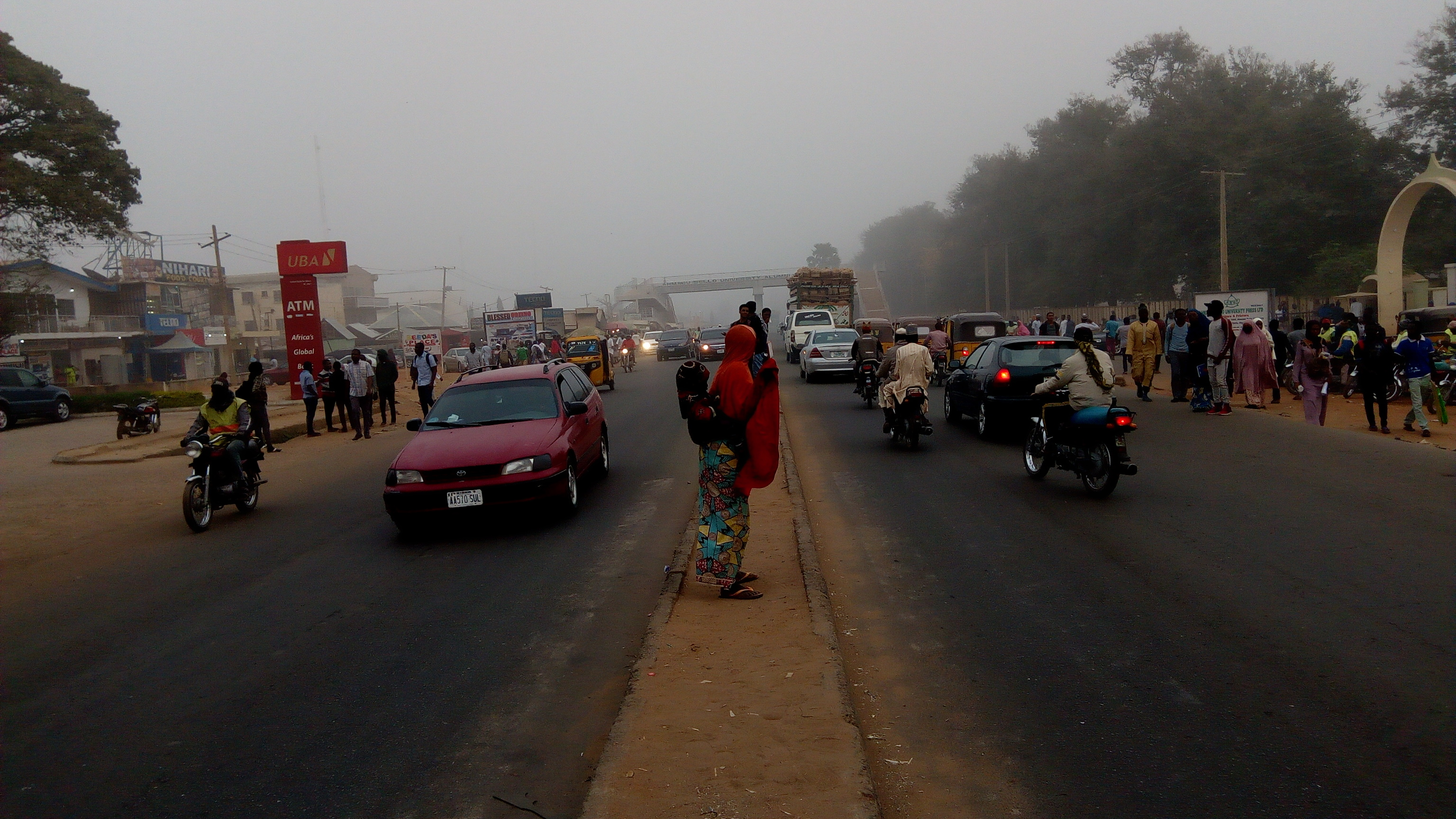
Zaria City Road, Kaduna

Because Zaria is north of the rail junction at Kaduna, it has equal rail access to the seaports at Lagos and Port Harcourt. However, only the railway between Lagos and Kano is functional, as the eastern line of Nigeria's rail network is not operational. This means that Zaria currently has rail access to Lagos and Kano to the north but not Port Harcourt.

From 1914 to 1927, Zaria was the break-of-gauge junction station for the Bauchi Light Railway to the tin mines at Jos.

== Education ==
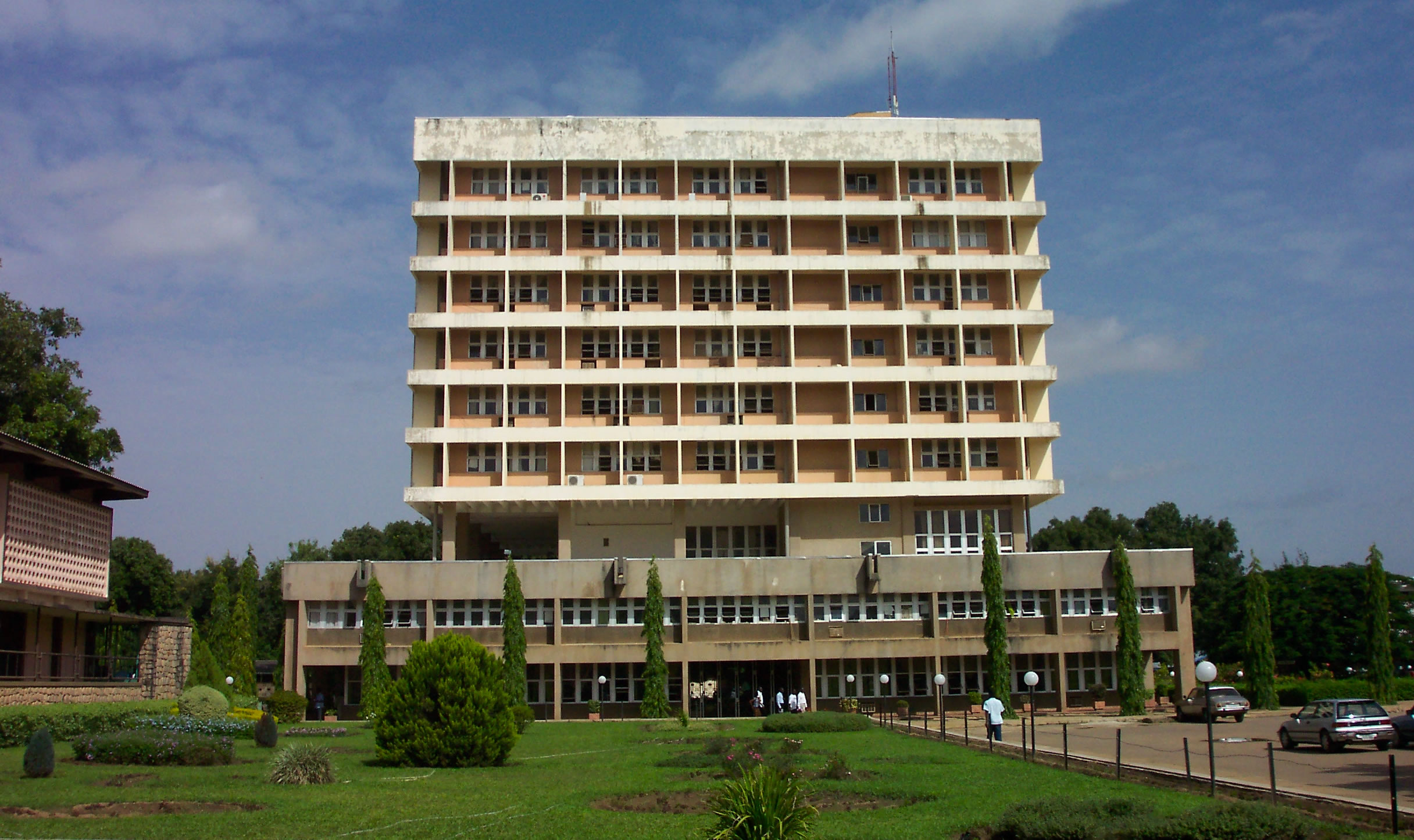
Senate building of the Ahmadu Bello University

Zaria is home to Ahmadu Bello University, the largest university in Nigeria and the second largest on the African continent. The institution is very prominent in the fields of Agriculture, Science, Finance, Medicine and Law. The school is known for the large number of elites from the region that passed through its academic buildings and counts among its alumni five who were Nigerian heads of state, including the late president Umaru Musa Yar'Adua.

Zaria is also the base for the Nigerian College of Aviation Technology, National Research Institute for Chemical Technology, Nigerian Army Depot, Nigerian Military school, Bassawa Baracks, Federal college of Education Zaria. Some historic secondary schools in the adjoining town of Wusasa, where the former Head of the Federal Military Government Yakubu Gowon resides are the St. Bartholomew's School and Science School Kufena, formerly known as St. Paul's College, also MAISS-GIWA a school established by The Emir of Zazzau Dr. Shehu Idris is situated there. Barewa College (formerly Katsina middle school) and Alhudahuda college are other famous secondary schools in the city.

== Institutions ==
- Ahmadu Bello University
- Nigerian College of Aviation Technology - Zaria
- Zaria Institute Of Information Technology

== Traditional festivals ==
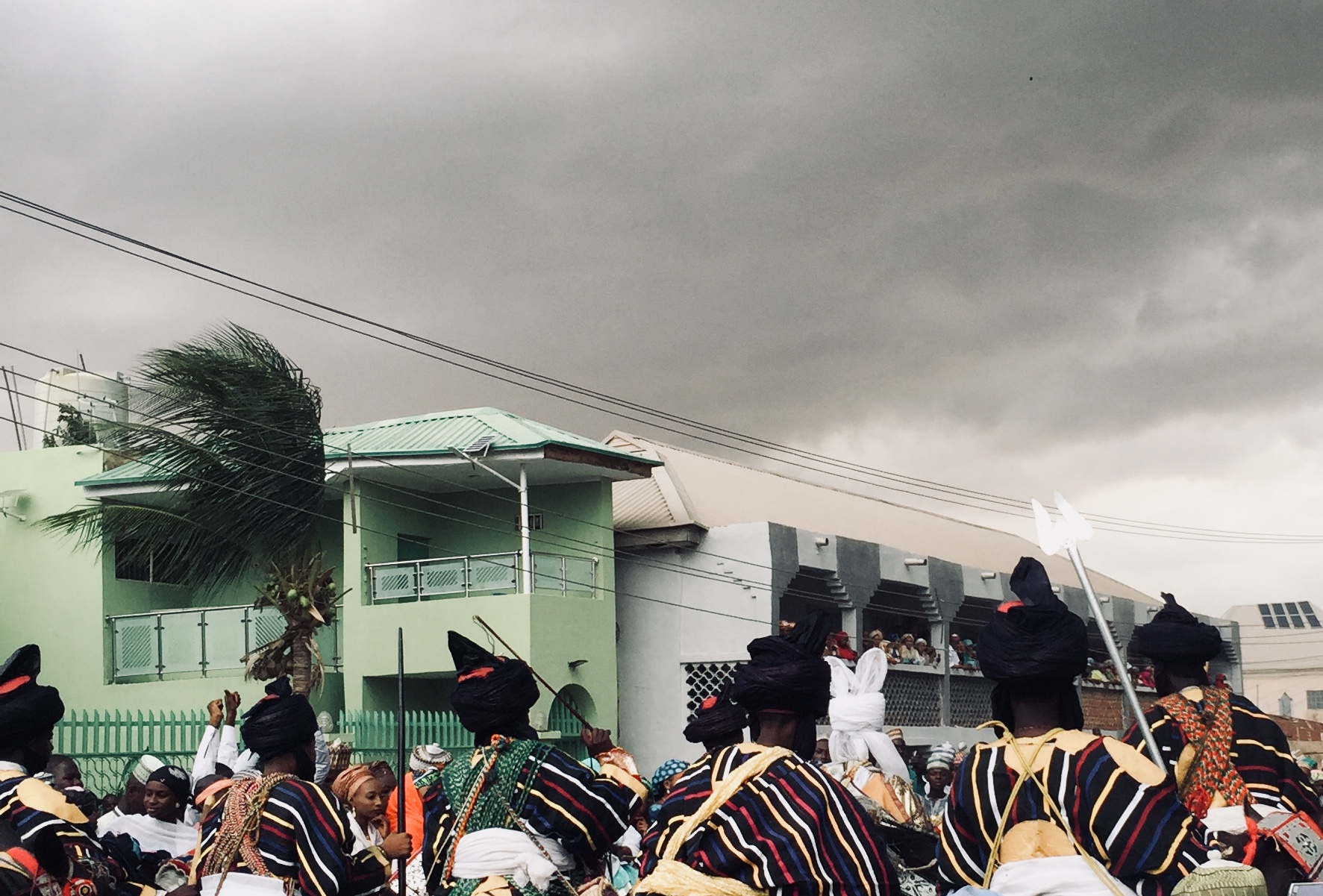
Durbar celebration in Zaria 2021

Zaria is among the northern cities that celebrates the annual cultural durbar festivals in Nigeria. The festival is celebrated twice a year which marks the end of Ramadan and also coincides with the Muslim festivals of Eid al-Adha and Eid al-Fitr respectively. In Zaria, the festival is celebrated in phases. The first day, known as Hawan Sallah, consists of the eid prayers and the subsequent tour by the emir around the city from the Eid ground to his palace in the company of District Heads and the royal guards, while the second and third days known as Hawan Bariki Sallah and Hawan Daushe respectively are for the last tour by the Emir around the city for the festival.

== Climate ==
Zaria has a tropical savanna climate (Köppen climate classification Aw) with warm weather year-round, a wet season lasting from April to September, and a drier season from October to March.

Climate data for Zaria (1991–2020)
Month	Jan	Feb	Mar	Apr	May	Jun	Jul	Aug	Sep	Oct	Nov	Dec	Year
Record high °C (°F)	38 (100)	39.5 (103.1)	40.2 (104.4)	41 (106)	40 (104)	38 (100)	34 (93)	32.8 (91.0)	34 (93)	35.4 (95.7)	37 (99)	36 (97)	41.0 (105.8)
Mean daily maximum °C (°F)	29.8 (85.6)	32.8 (91.0)	36.0 (96.8)	36.6 (97.9)	34.0 (93.2)	31.2 (88.2)	29.3 (84.7)	28.5 (83.3)	30.1 (86.2)	31.7 (89.1)	32.2 (90.0)	30.2 (86.4)	31.9 (89.4)
Daily mean °C (°F)	22.2 (72.0)	25.1 (77.2)	28.6 (83.5)	30.0 (86.0)	28.4 (83.1)	26.4 (79.5)	25.1 (77.2)	24.5 (76.1)	25.3 (77.5)	25.9 (78.6)	24.6 (76.3)	22.5 (72.5)	25.7 (78.3)
Mean daily minimum °C (°F)	14.6 (58.3)	17.4 (63.3)	21.2 (70.2)	23.4 (74.1)	22.7 (72.9)	21.5 (70.7)	20.8 (69.4)	20.5 (68.9)	20.6 (69.1)	20.1 (68.2)	17.0 (62.6)	14.8 (58.6)	19.6 (67.3)
Record low °C (°F)	9 (48)	11 (52)	15 (59)	14 (57)	16 (61)	17.5 (63.5)	16 (61)	17.8 (64.0)	18 (64)	14 (57)	12 (54)	8.8 (47.8)	8.8 (47.8)
Average precipitation mm (inches)	0.0 (0.0)	0.3 (0.01)	5.6 (0.22)	32.7 (1.29)	121.9 (4.80)	147.9 (5.82)	232.1 (9.14)	301.9 (11.89)	208.0 (8.19)	66.4 (2.61)	0.1 (0.00)	0.0 (0.0)	1,116.7 (43.96)
Average precipitation days (≥ 1.0 mm)	0.0	0.0	0.5	2.9	8.4	10.6	13.5	16.6	13.9	4.9	0.0	0.0	71.4
Average relative humidity (%)	37.2	31.1	32.7	51.3	69.2	77.6	82.4	85.8	83.6	73.4	53.1	44.9	60.2
Source: NOAA

== Environment ==
=== Air quality ===
A 2019 study of air pollution in Zaria found that pollution concentrations were within the expected national standards for air pollution.

=== Land use ===
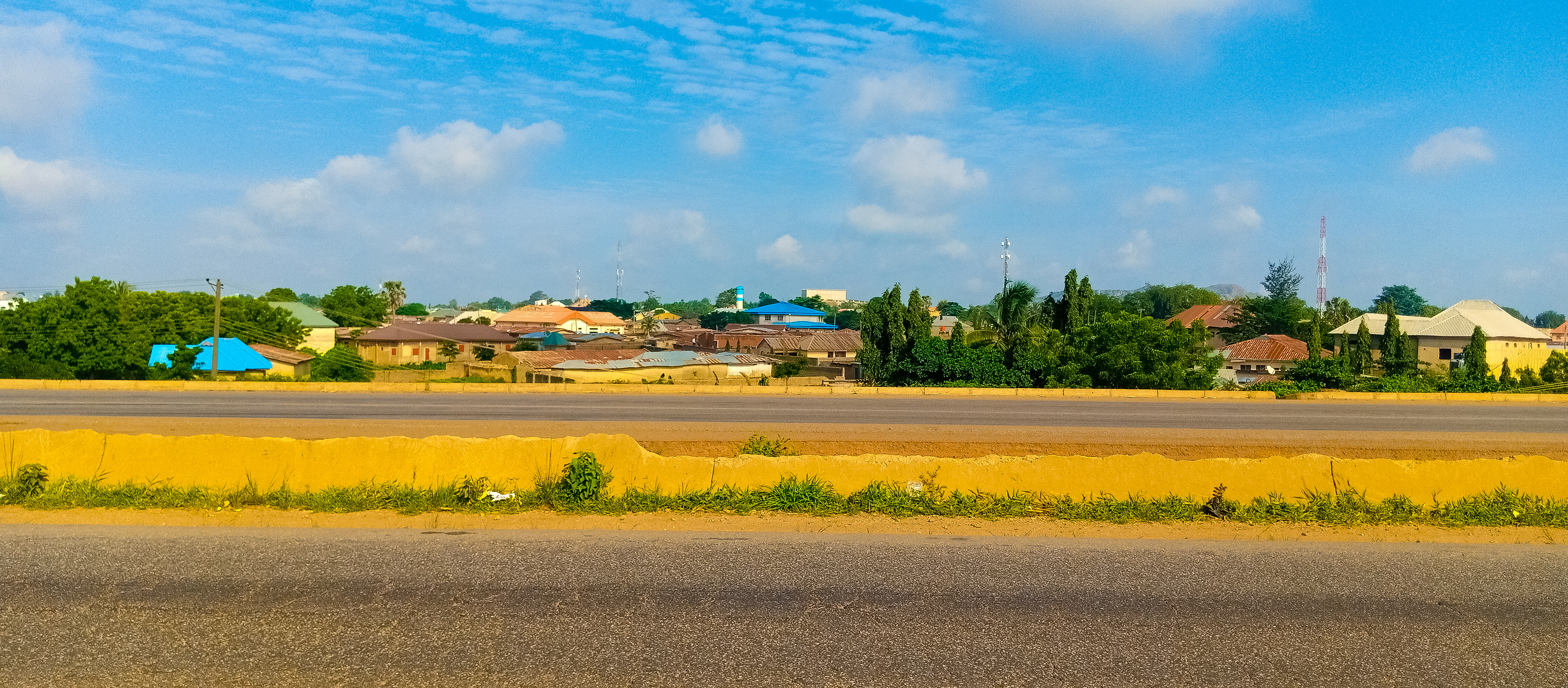
This is a place in Zaria City, Kaduna State, high way from Kaduna to Zaria to Kano

Zaria's geography and previous land use meant that much of the city's historical land cover was barren. A 2020 study found that barren land decreased from 1990 to 2020 while built environment increased 66 percent and vegetative land increased by 29%. Vegetation had been decreasing from 1990 to 2005, but the study area found a dramatic increase due to agriculture and reforestation afterwards. Predictive modeling based on local policy and urban development trends suggested that increase in urban and vegetative land cover would continue through 2050.

=== Water supply and sanitation ===
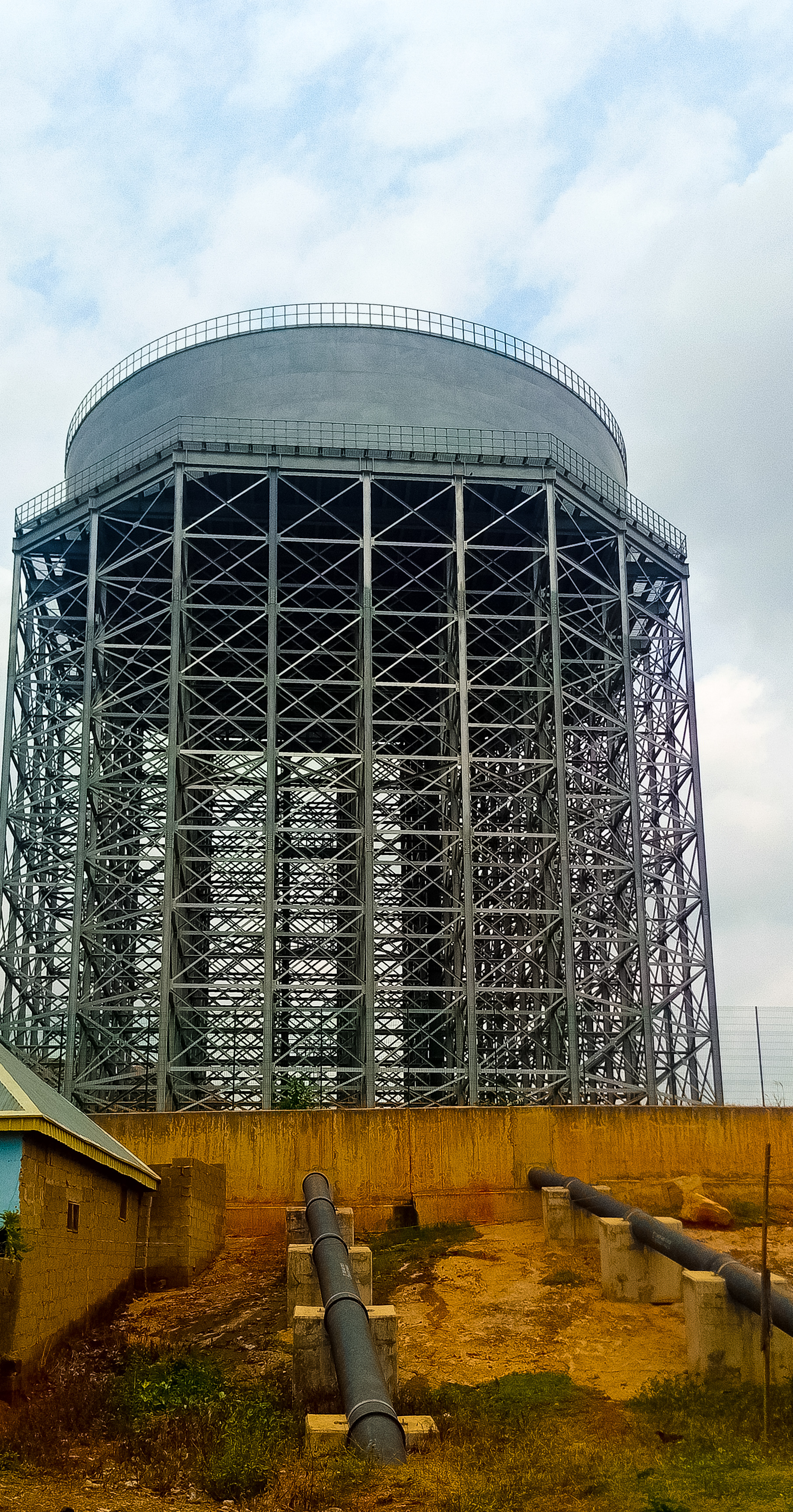

Water provided to the city comes from Kaduna State Water Board. As of 2012, the city of Zaria had 30% access to clean water supply. The African Development Fund issued funding for an expansion project in 2013 for 100 million dollars of $480 million. The project had problems with some of its local contractors, resulting in the African Development Bank banning four companies from further participating in bank funding projects. As of August 2020, 60% of water in the system was unaccounted for because of illegal connections, poor metering practices, and poor maintenance.

== Notable people ==
- Ango Abdullahi is the former Vice Chancellor of Ahmadu Bello University, Zaria
- Shola Ameobi, football player
- Bashir Abubakar, retired Nigerian custom officer, politician Businessman
- Yusuf Datti Baba-Ahmed, Vice Presidential candidate of the Labour Party in 2023 general elections, Senator for Kaduna North from 2011 to 2012 and member of the House of Representatives from 2003 to 2007
- Tajudeen Abbas, speaker of the 10th House of representatives of the Federal Republic of Nigeria.
- Ahmed Nuhu Bamalli, current emir of Zazzau. He was former ambassador of Nigeria to Thailand with concurrent accreditation with Myanmar.
- Nuhu Bamalli, minister of foreign affairs in the first republic, author, state commissioner, former businessman. The state polytechnic is named after him.
- D'banj, musician/Artist
- Umaru Dikko, minister in the second republic
- Edoheart, musician, poet, dancer
- Abubakar Imam, author and novelist
- Shehu Ladan, lawyer, philanthropist and former GMD of Nigerian National Petroleum Corporation (NNPC)
- Rilwanu Lukman, engineer and former Secretary General of OPEC
- Rumun Ndur, first Nigerian hockey player in the NHL
- Josephine Obiajulu Odumakin, women's rights activist
- Adewale Olukoju, athlete
- Namadi Sambo, former Vice President of Nigeria
- Joshua Selman, gospel minister and televangelist. He is the founder and senior pastor of the Eternity Network International – a Gospel fellowship
- Masai Ujiri, President of the Toronto Raptors of the NBA and first international winner of the NBA Executive of the Year award
- Mukhtar Ramalan Yero, former Governor of Kaduna State.
- Sheikh Albaniy Zaria, Islamic cleric, founder, Darul Hadith Assalafiyya Zaria Nigeria
- Sheikh Ibrahim Zakzaky, Shia Islamic cleric, founder, Islamic Movement in Nigeria
- Zainab Ahmed, former minister of budget and national planning

== Gallery ==
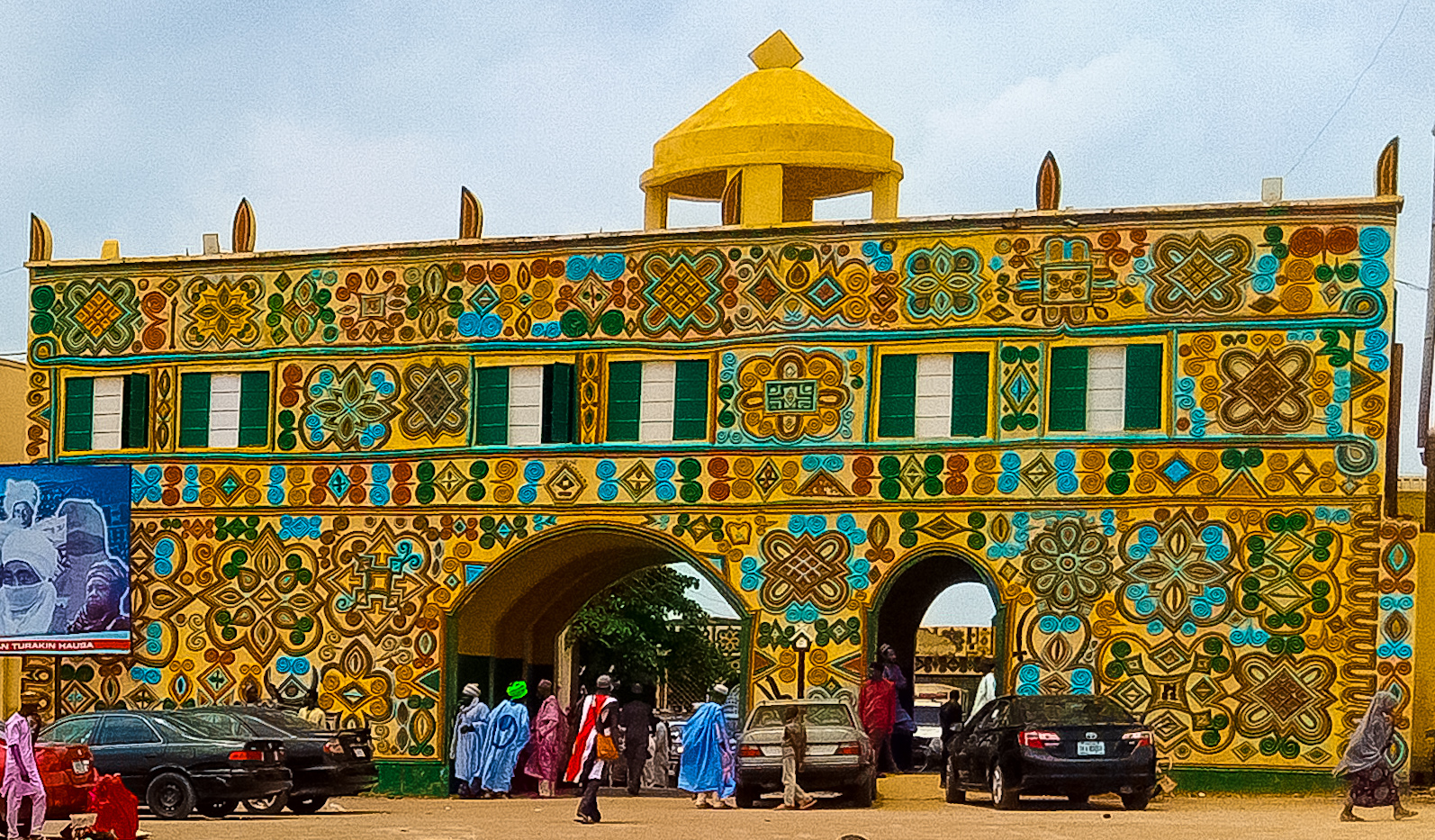

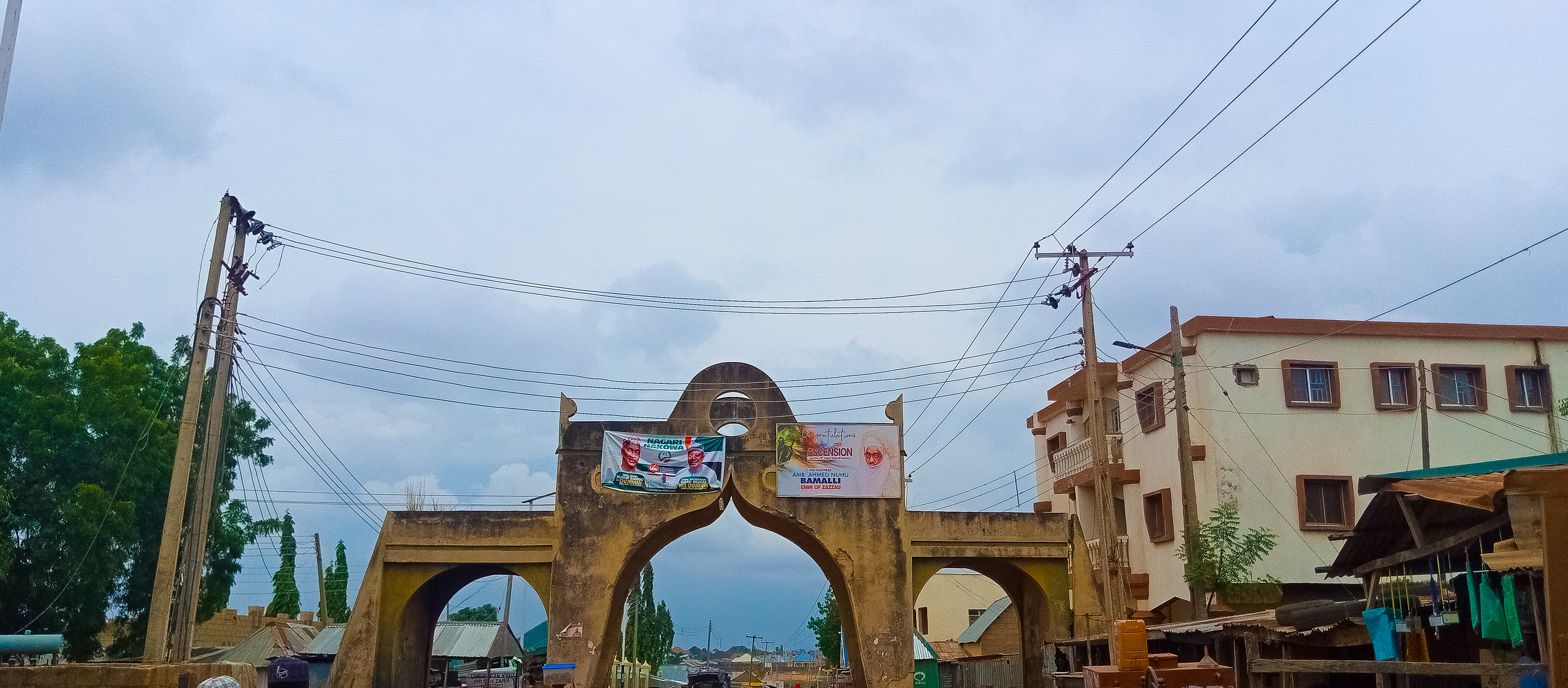

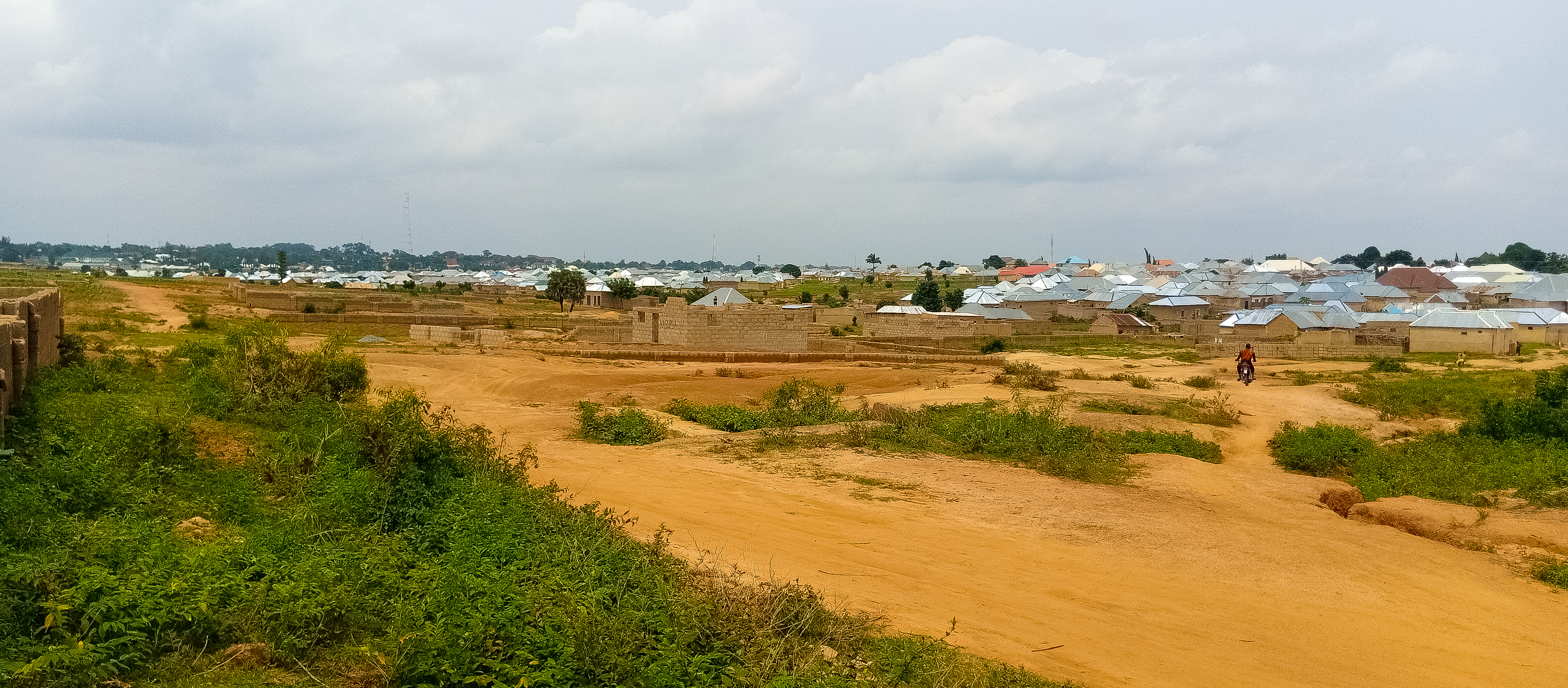

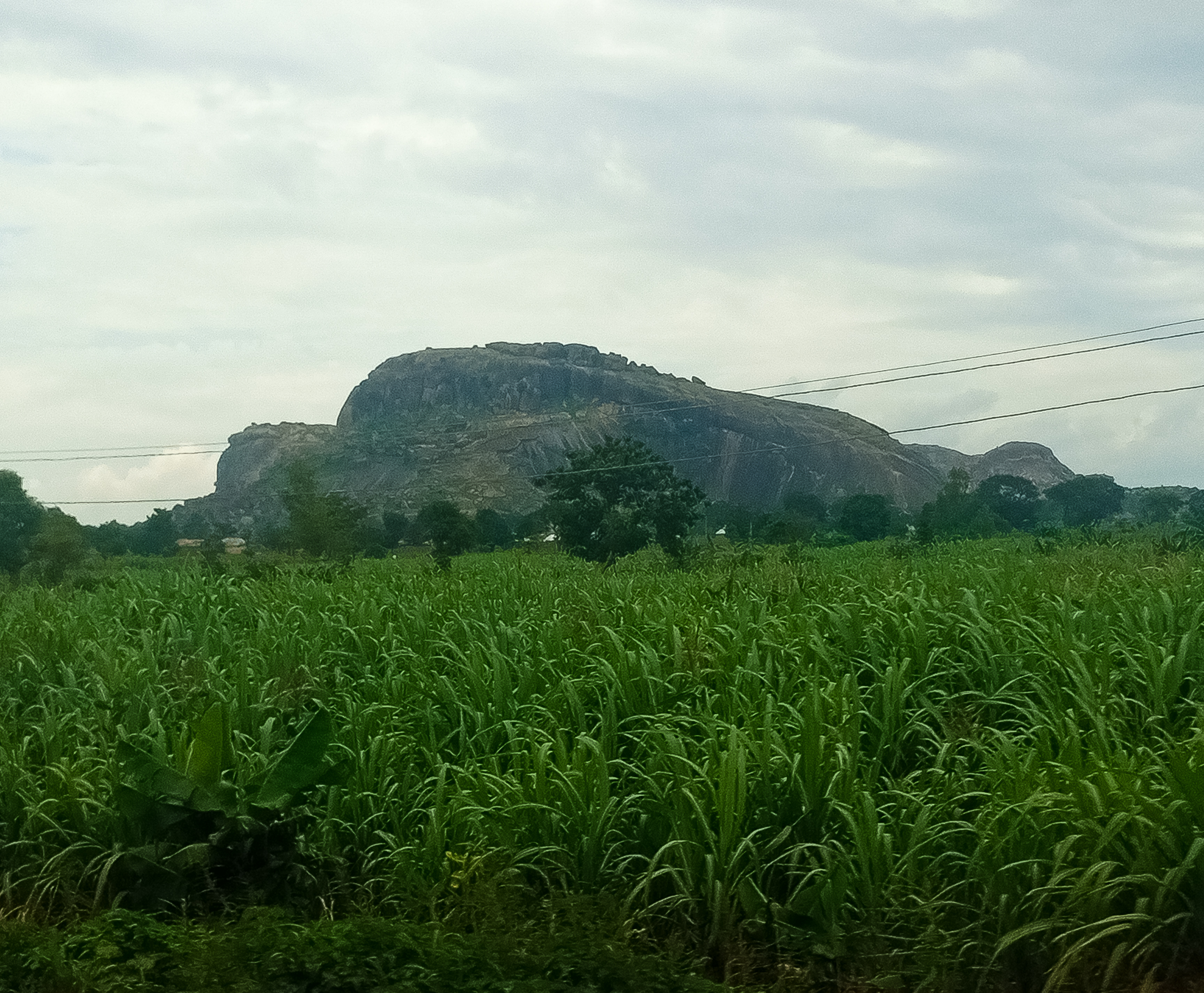

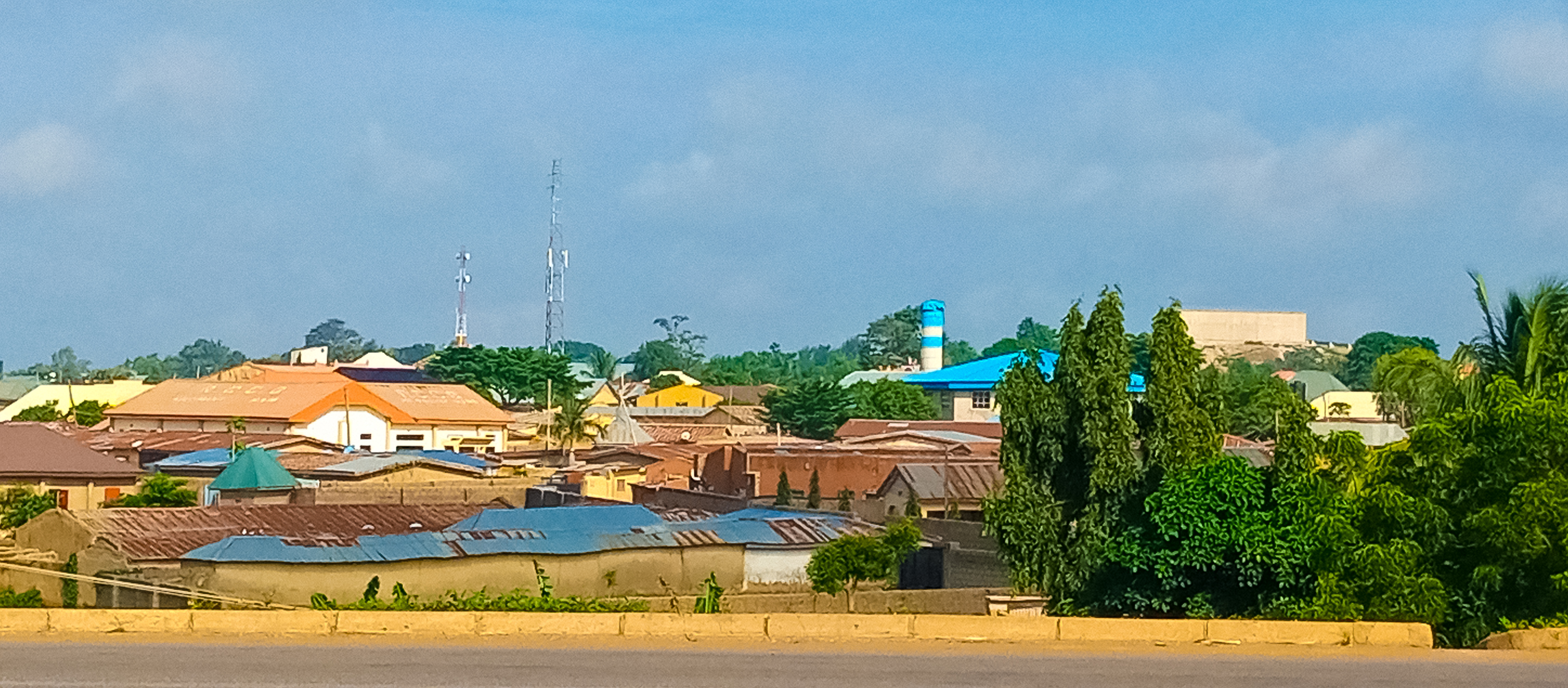

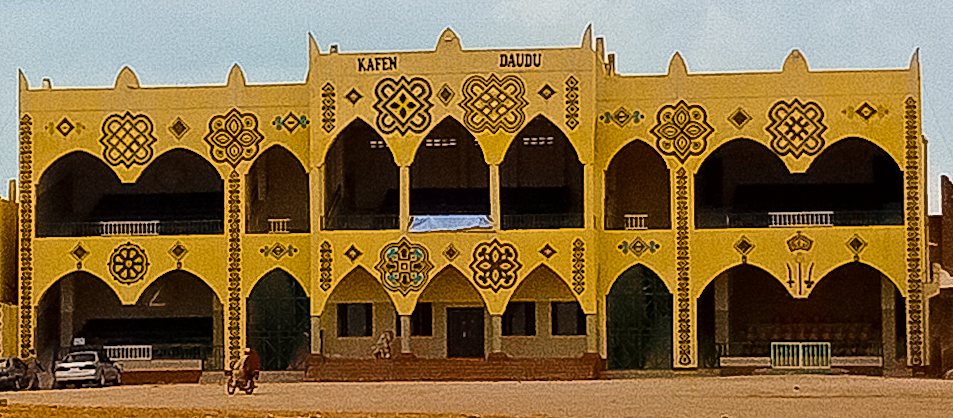

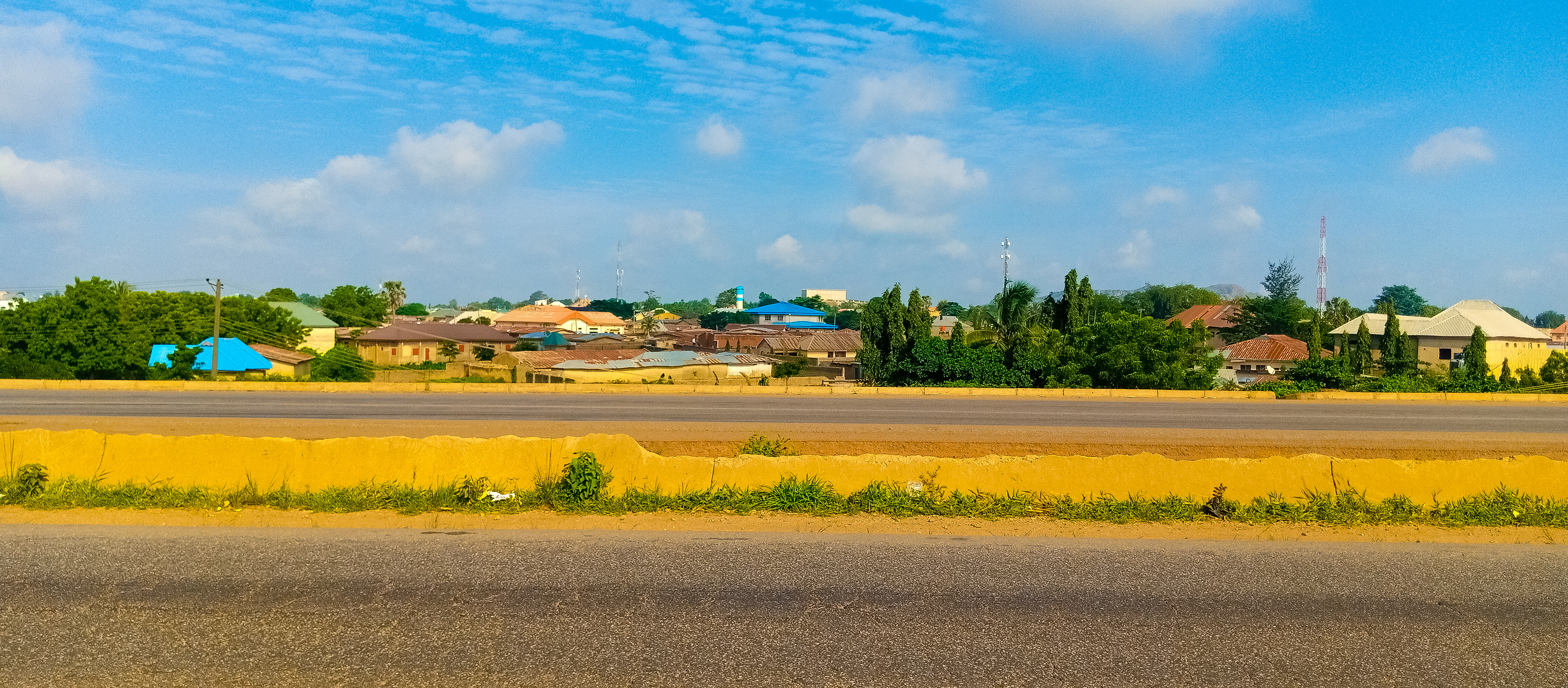

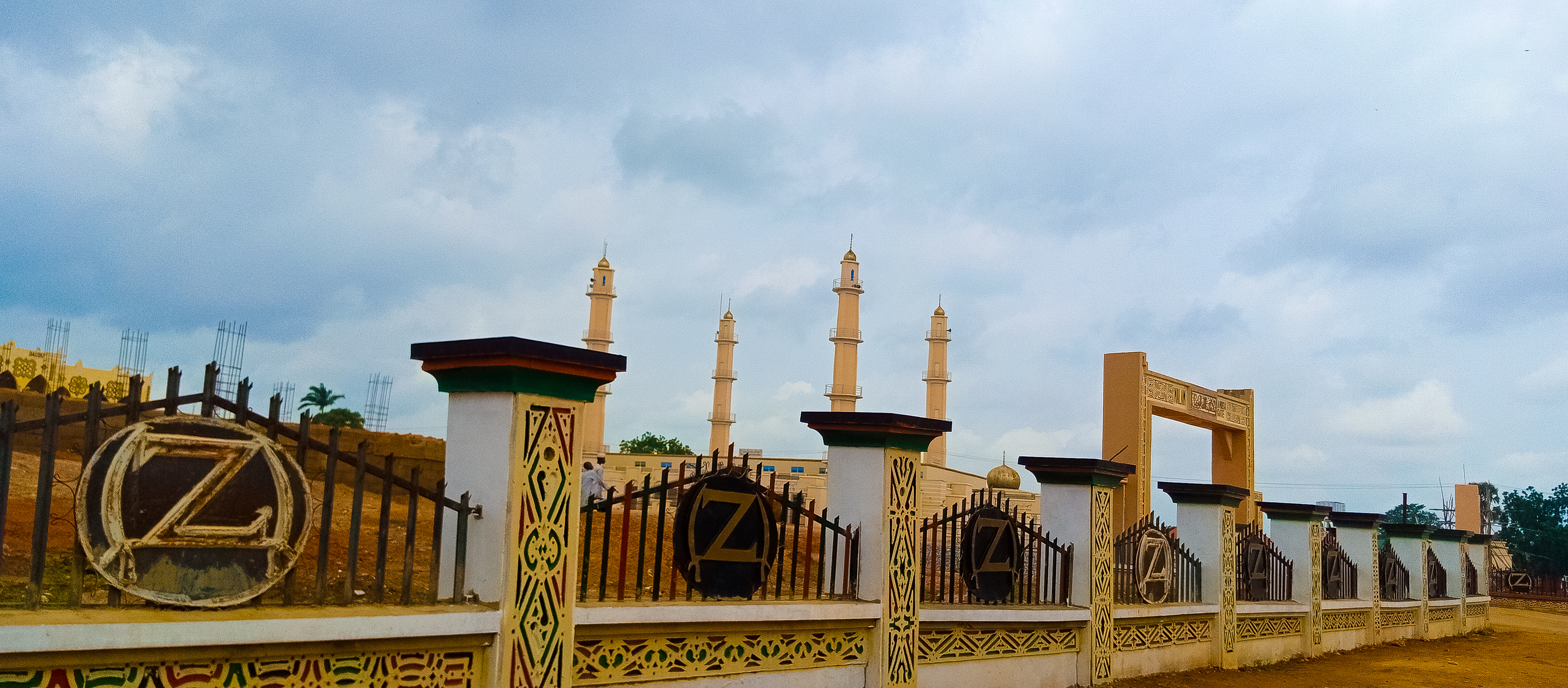

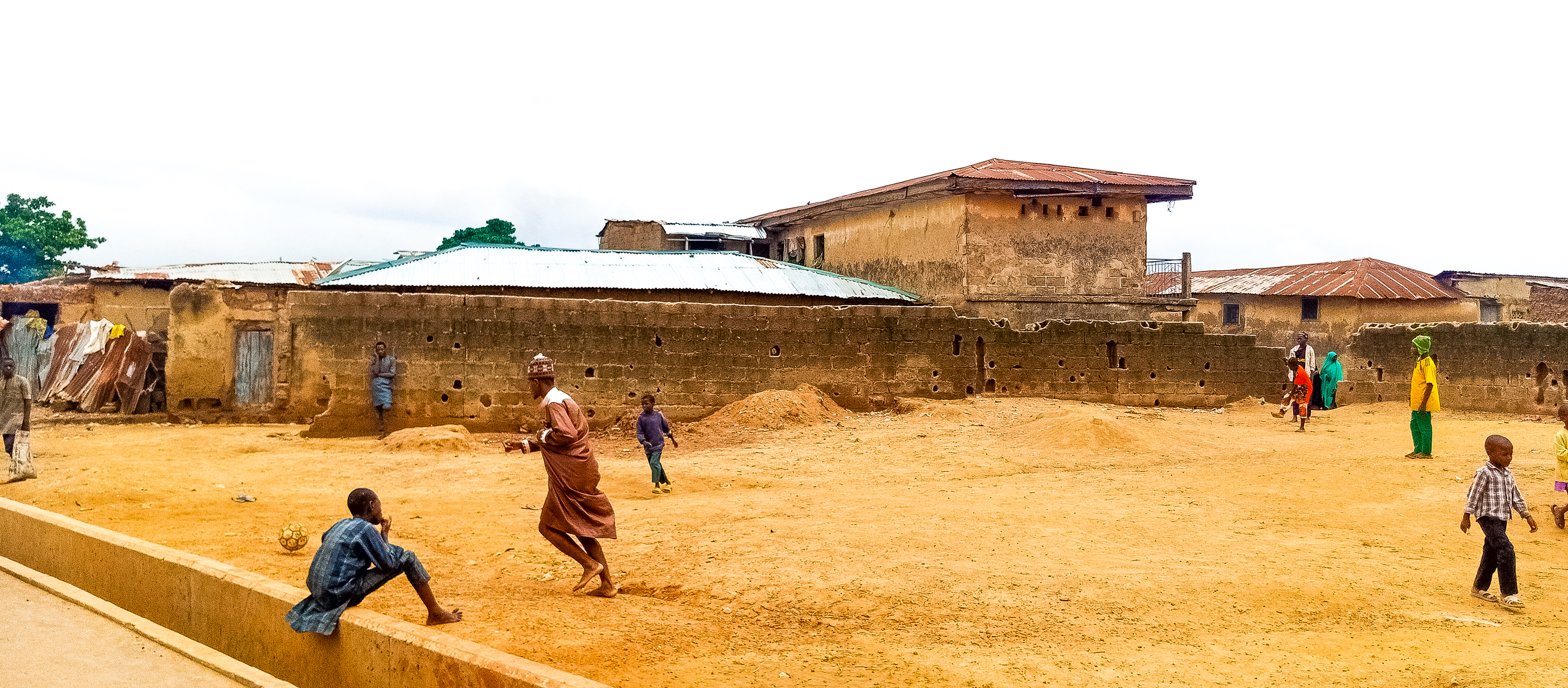

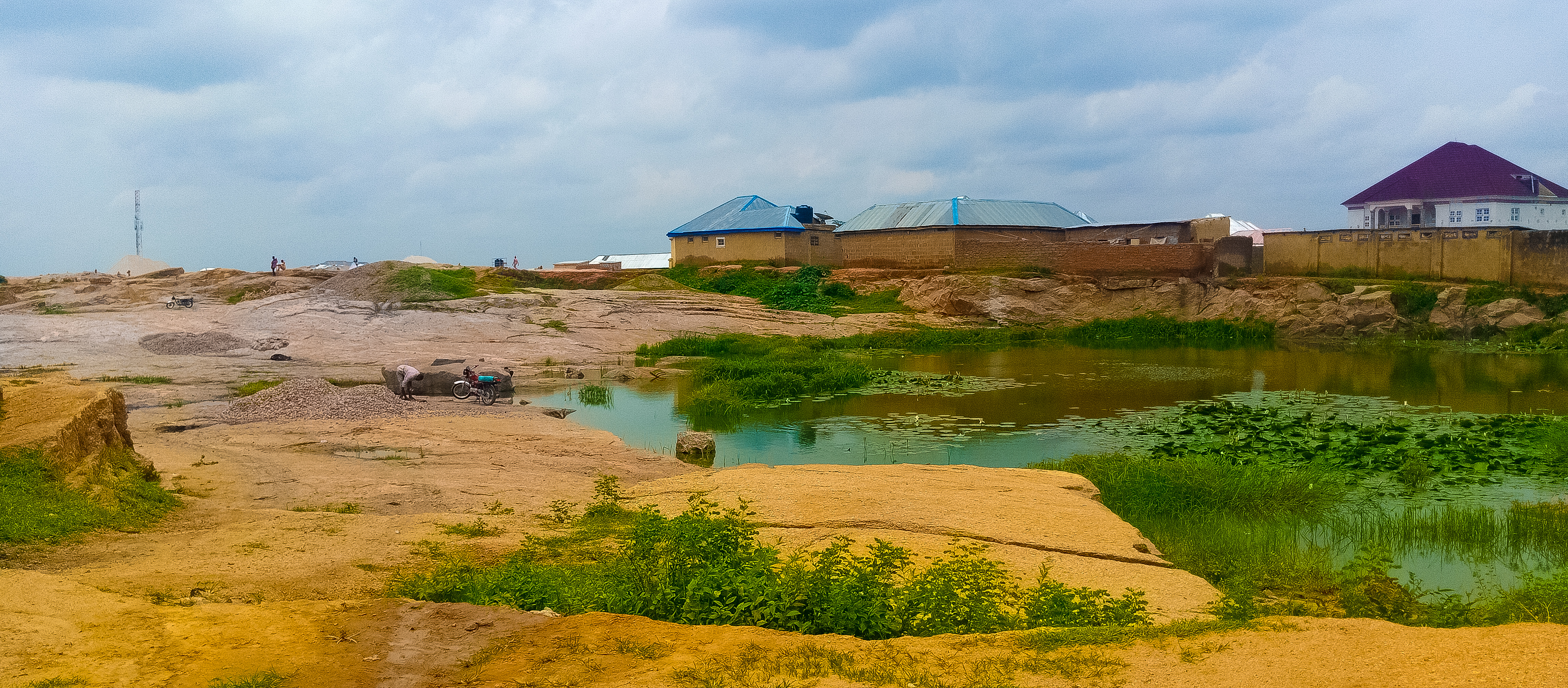

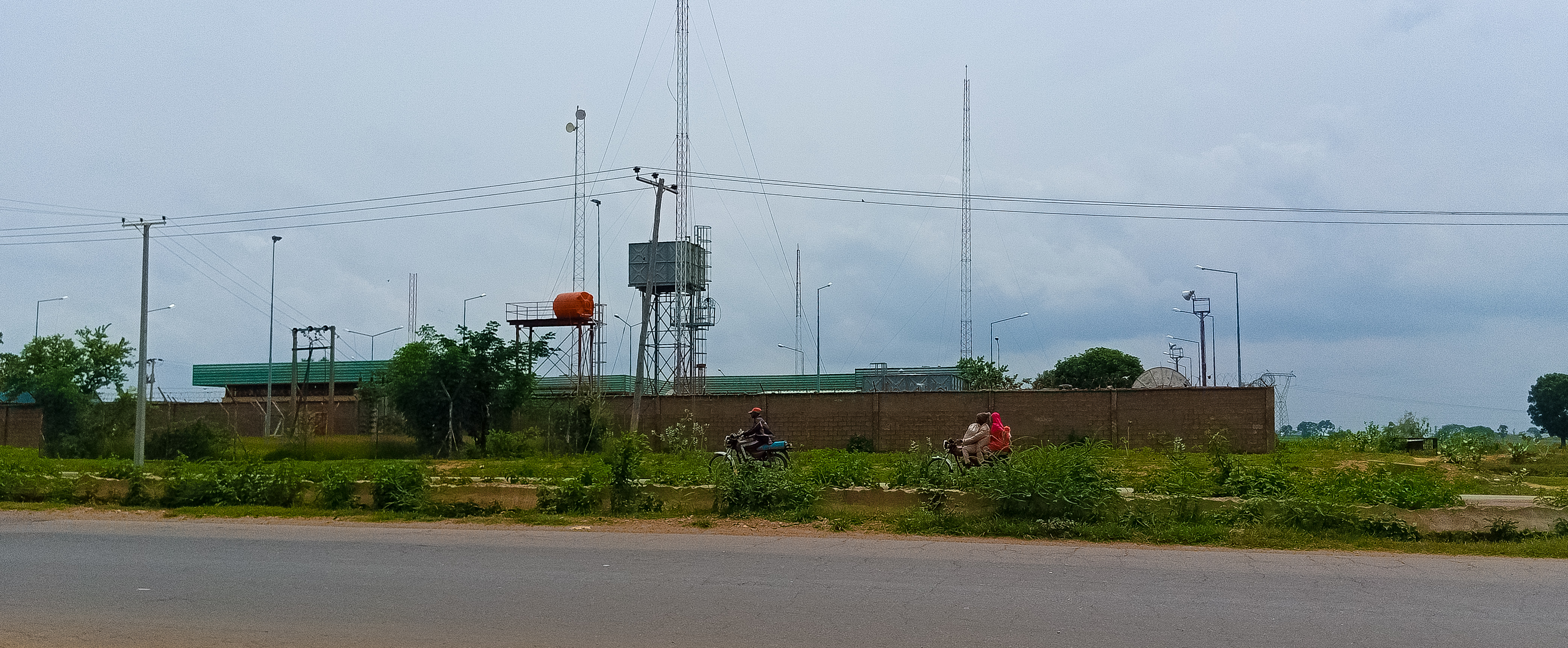

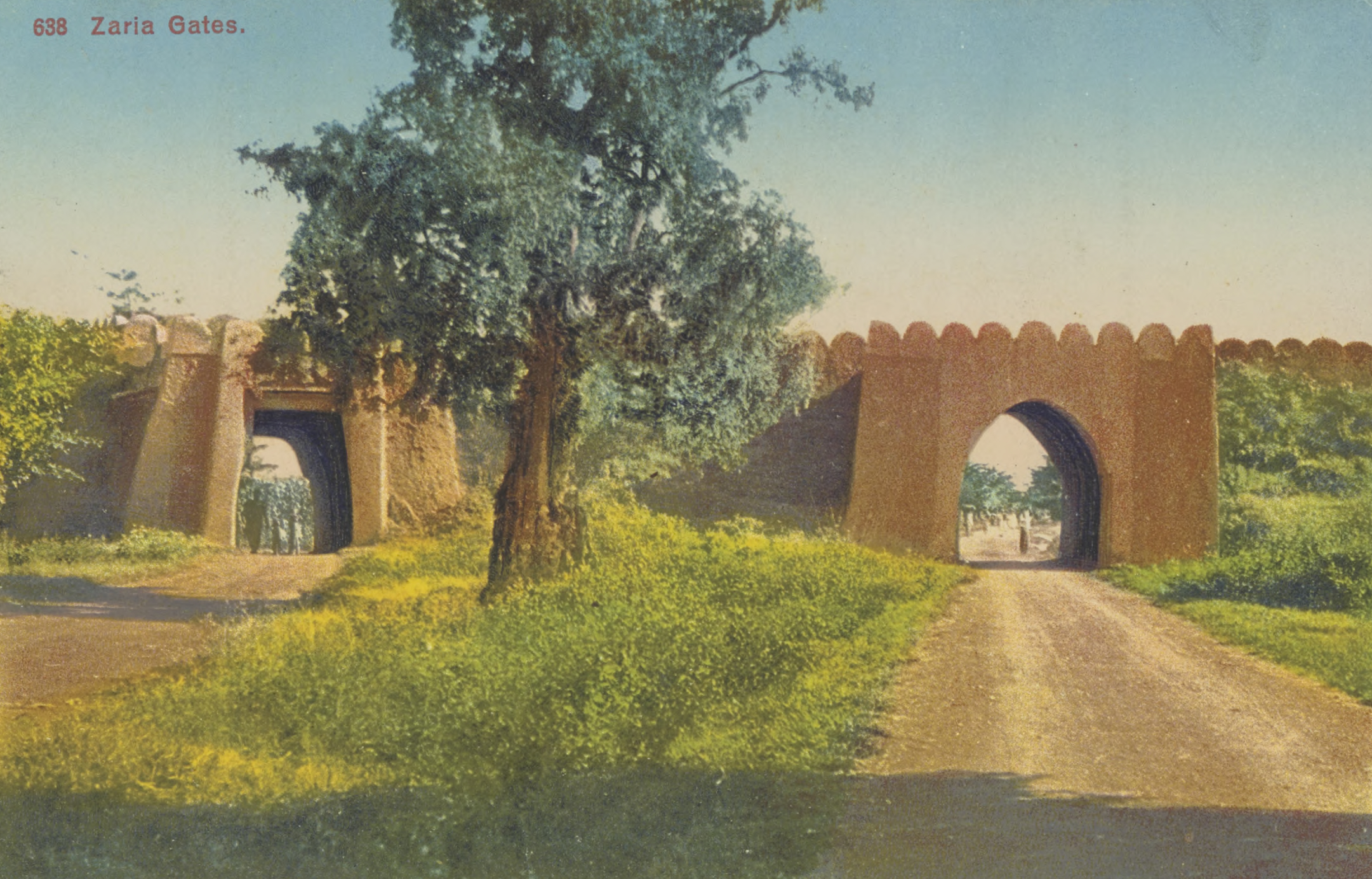

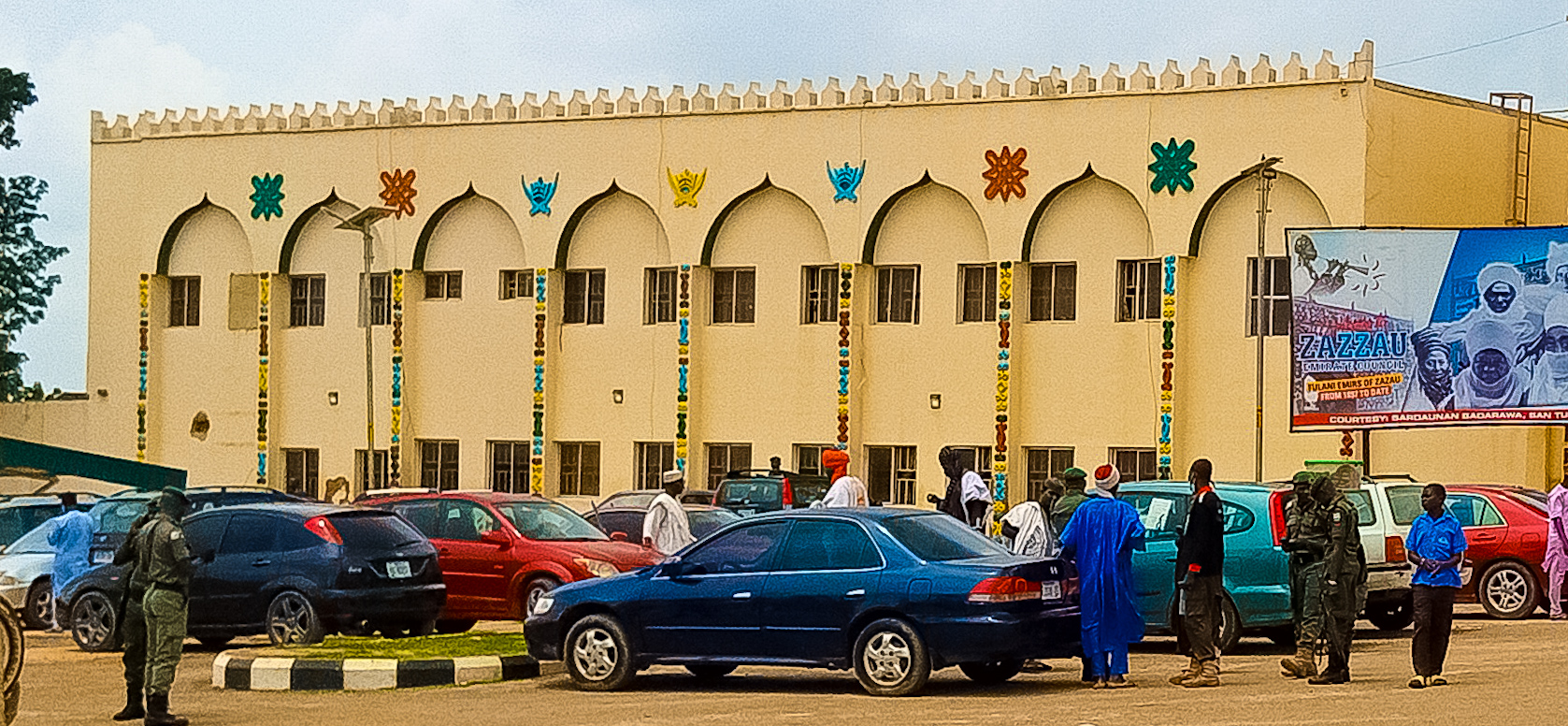

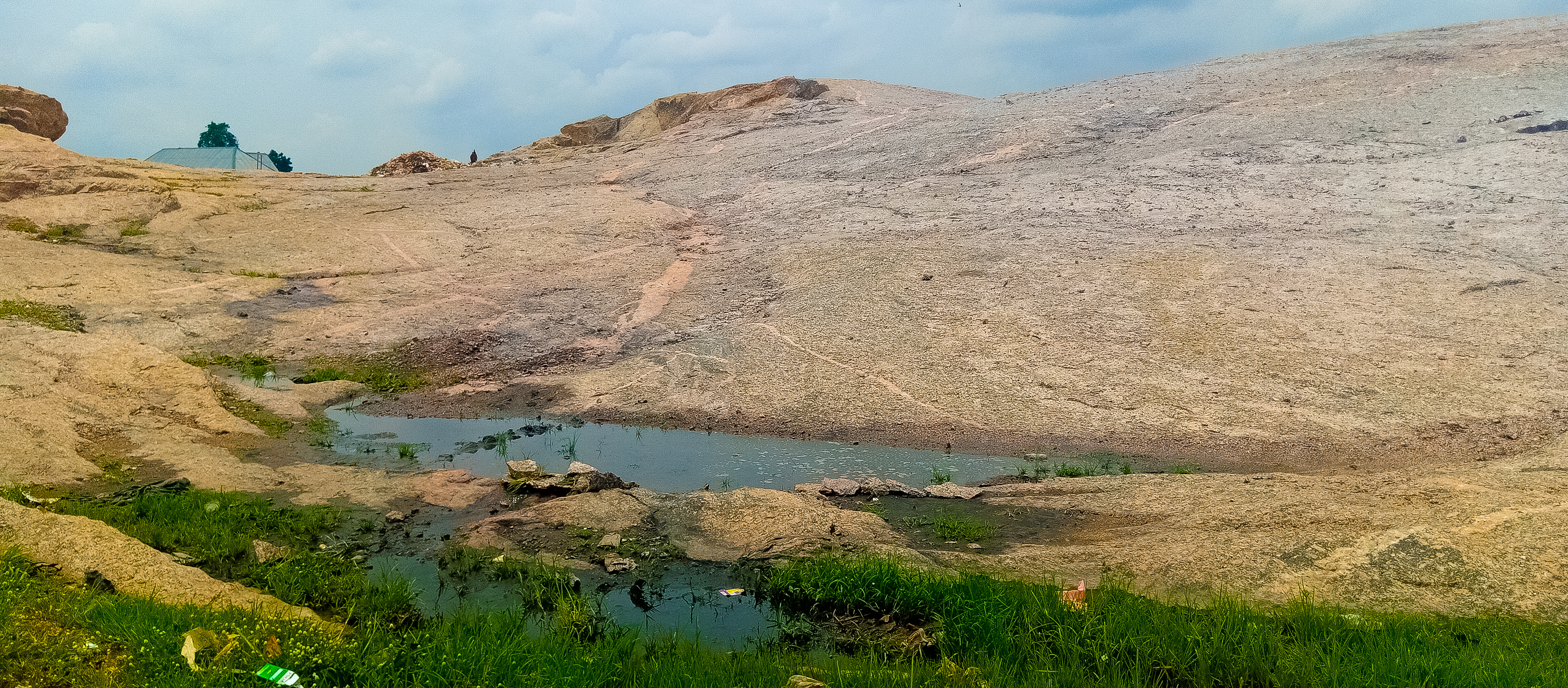

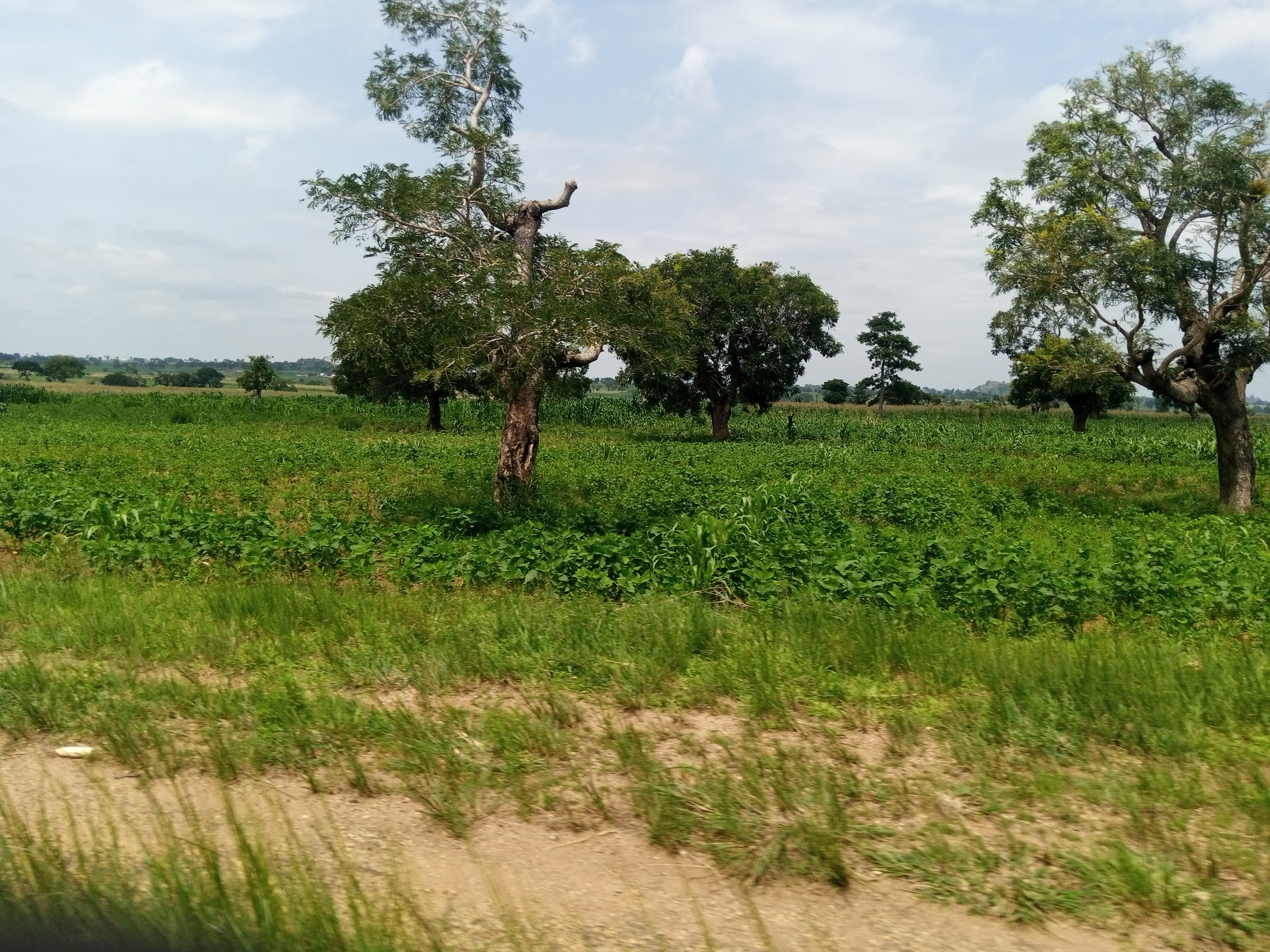

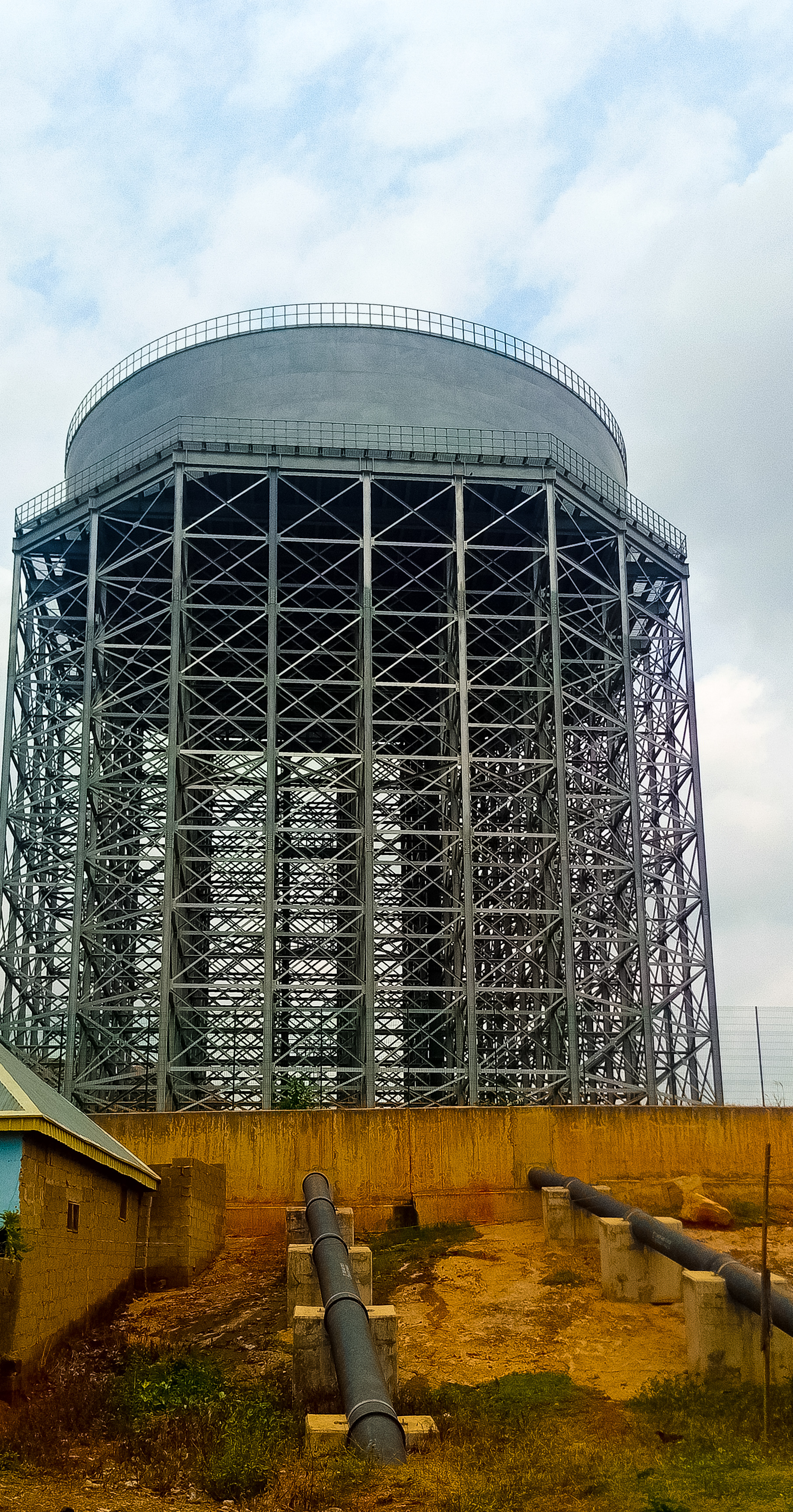

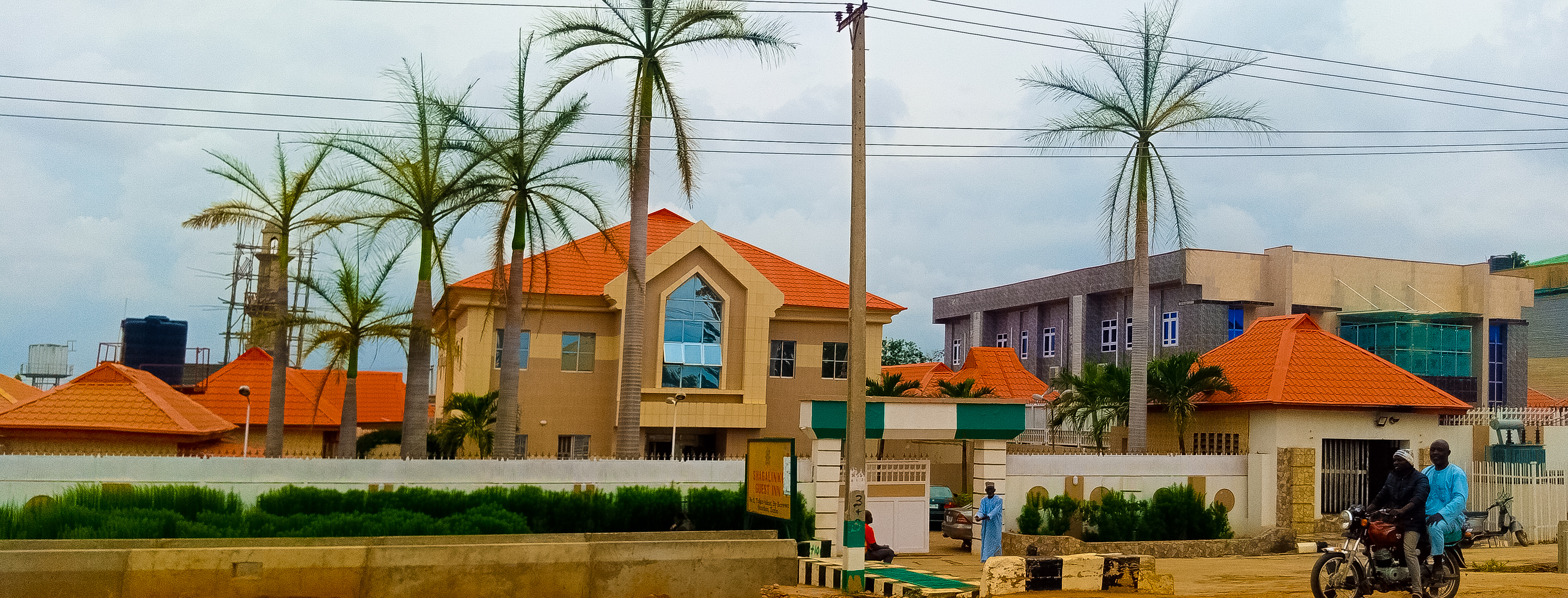

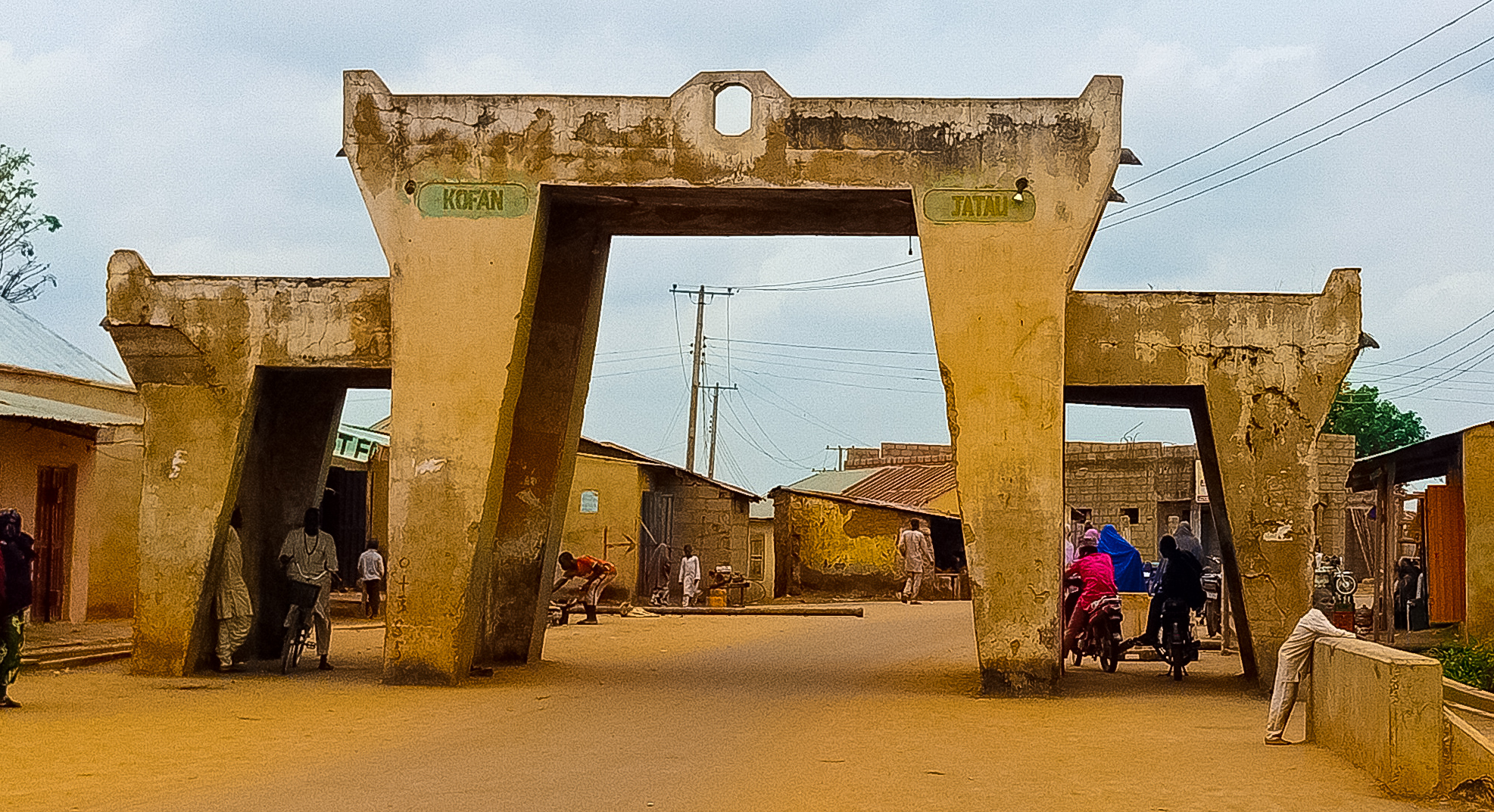

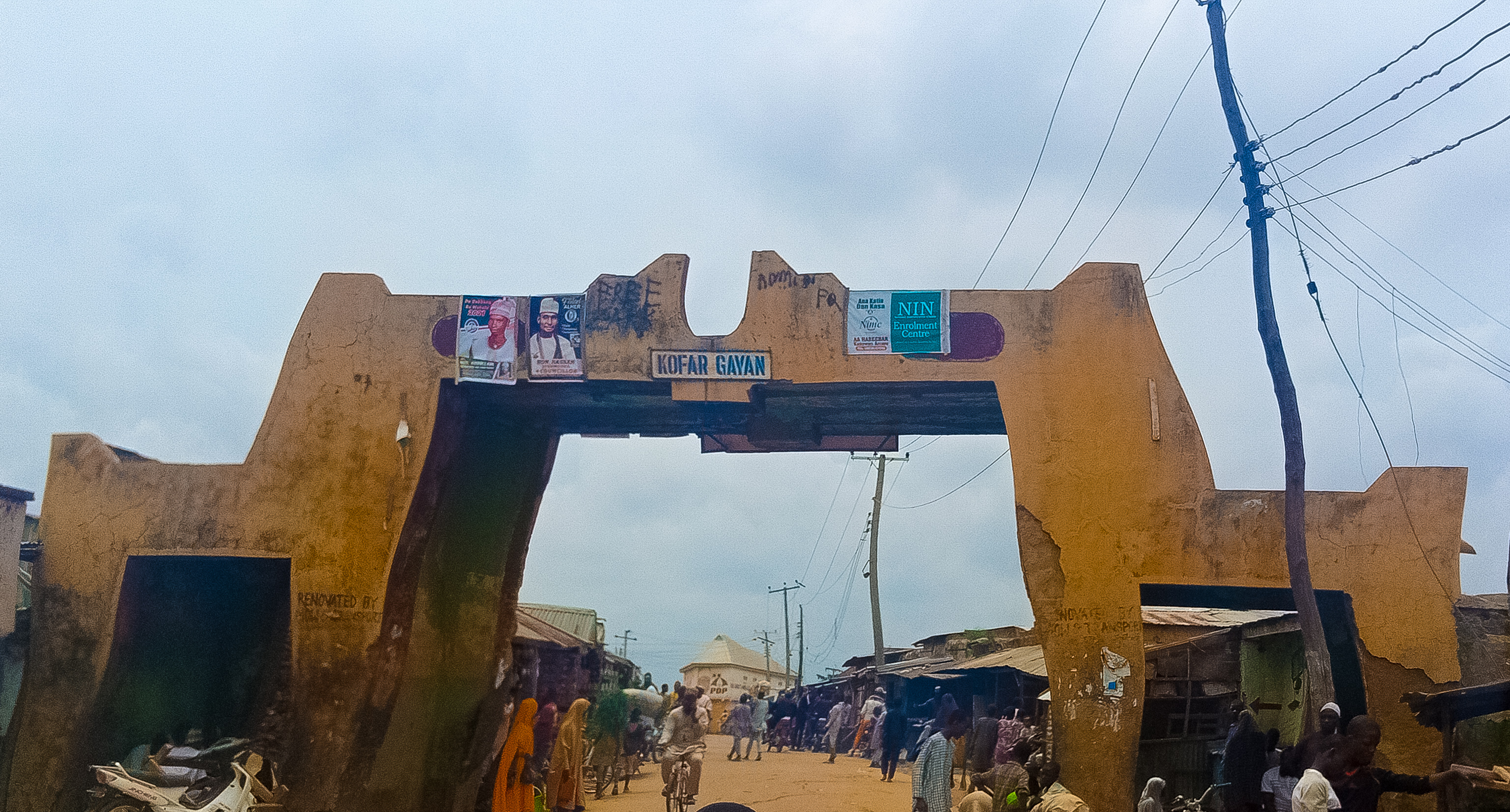

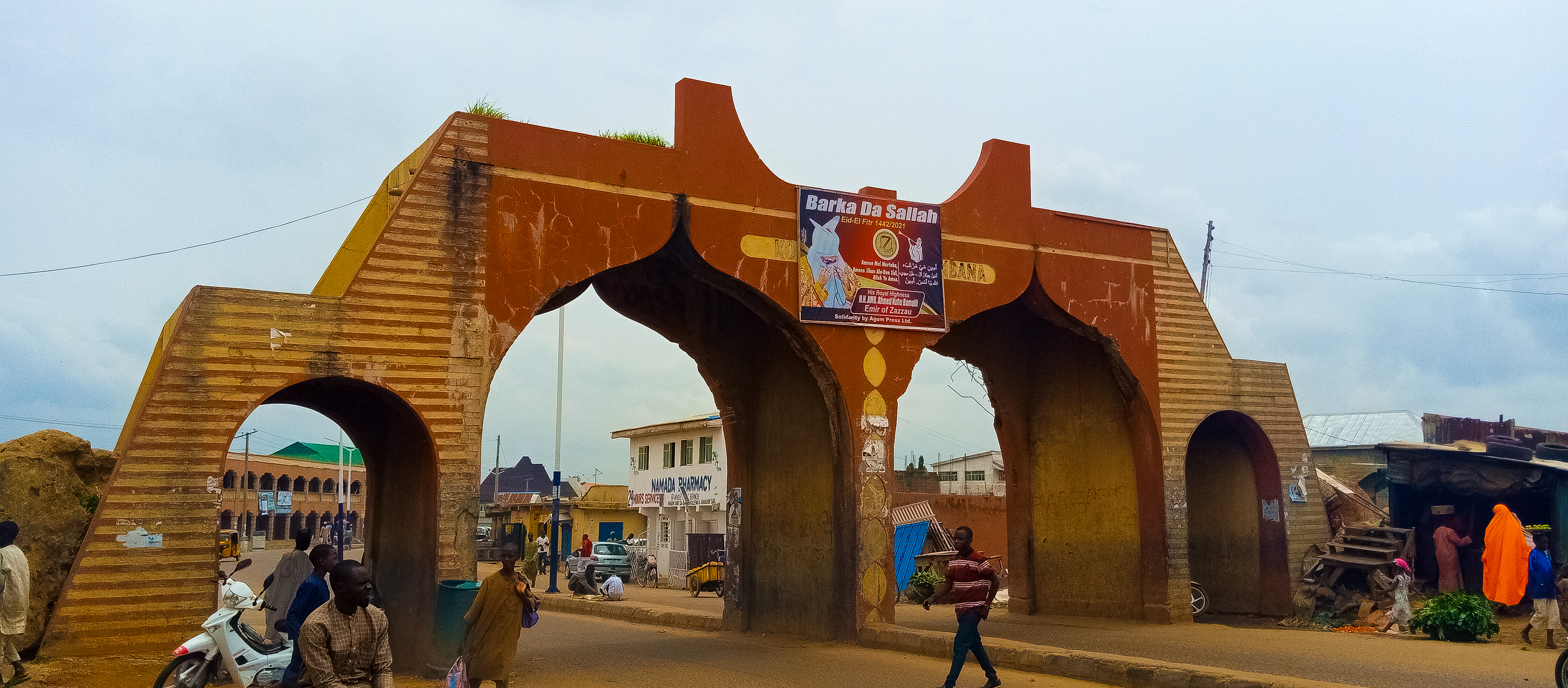

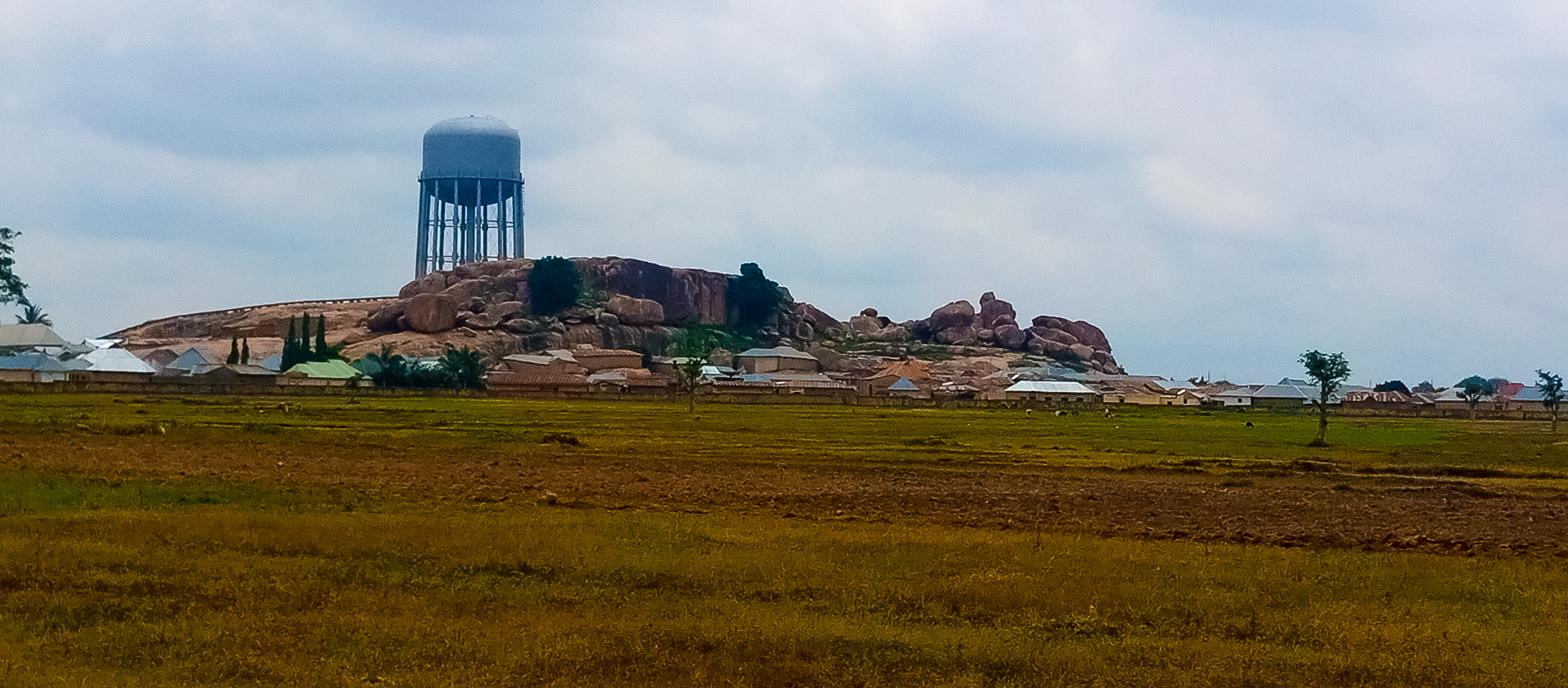

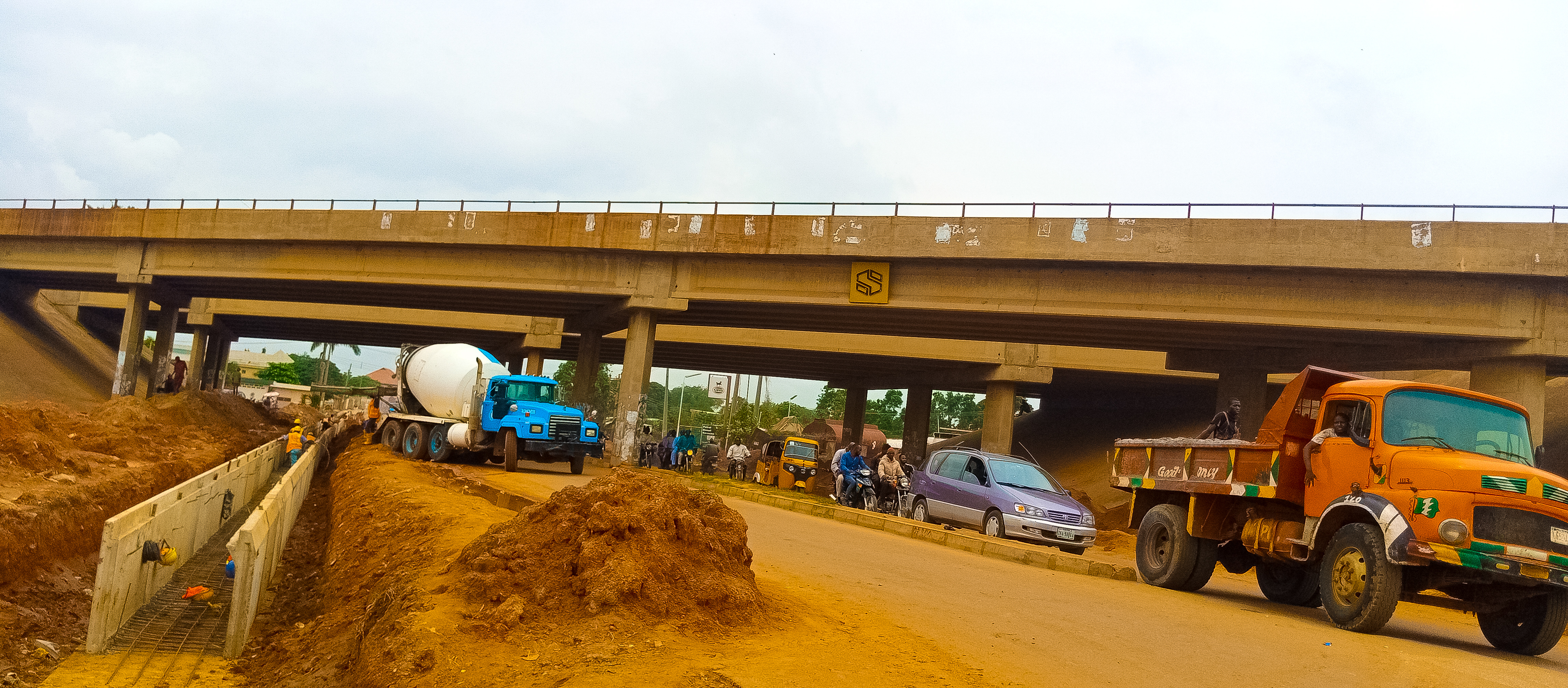

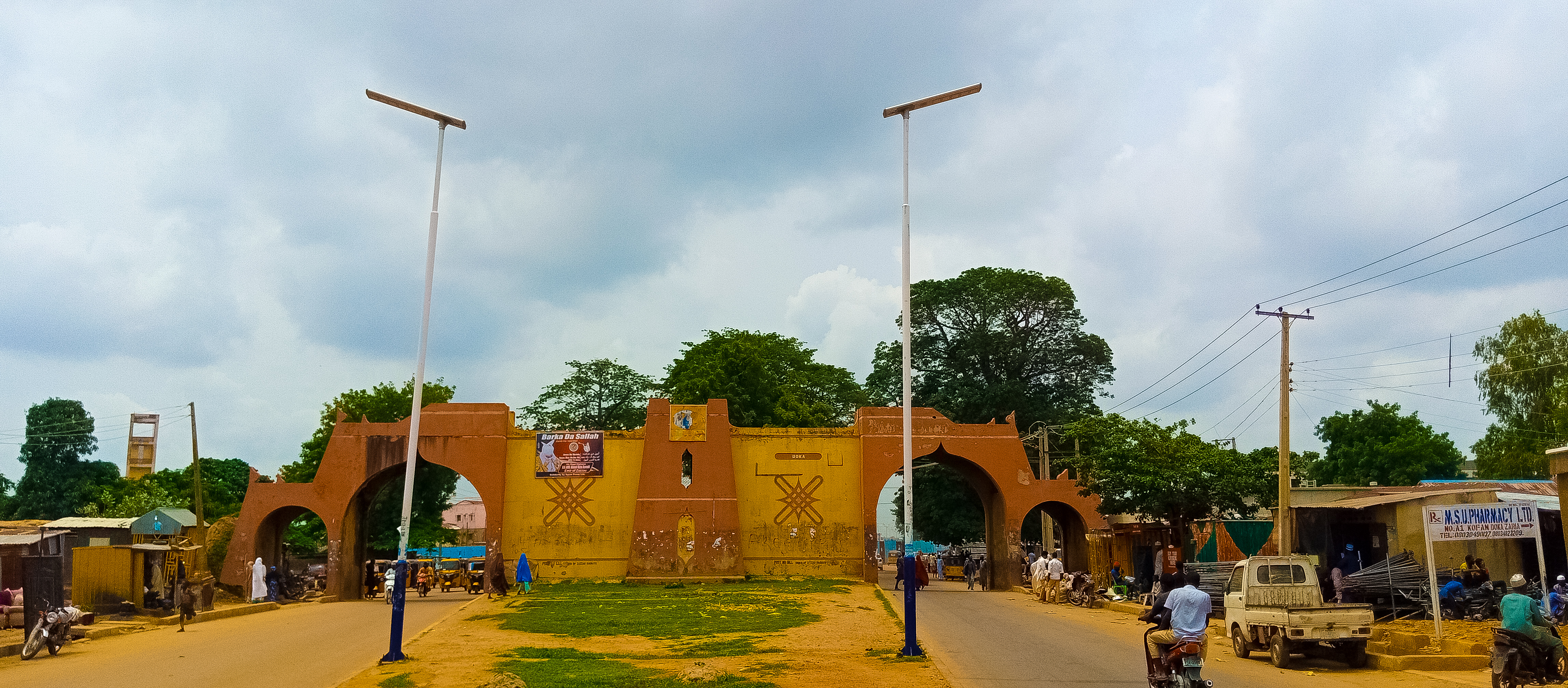

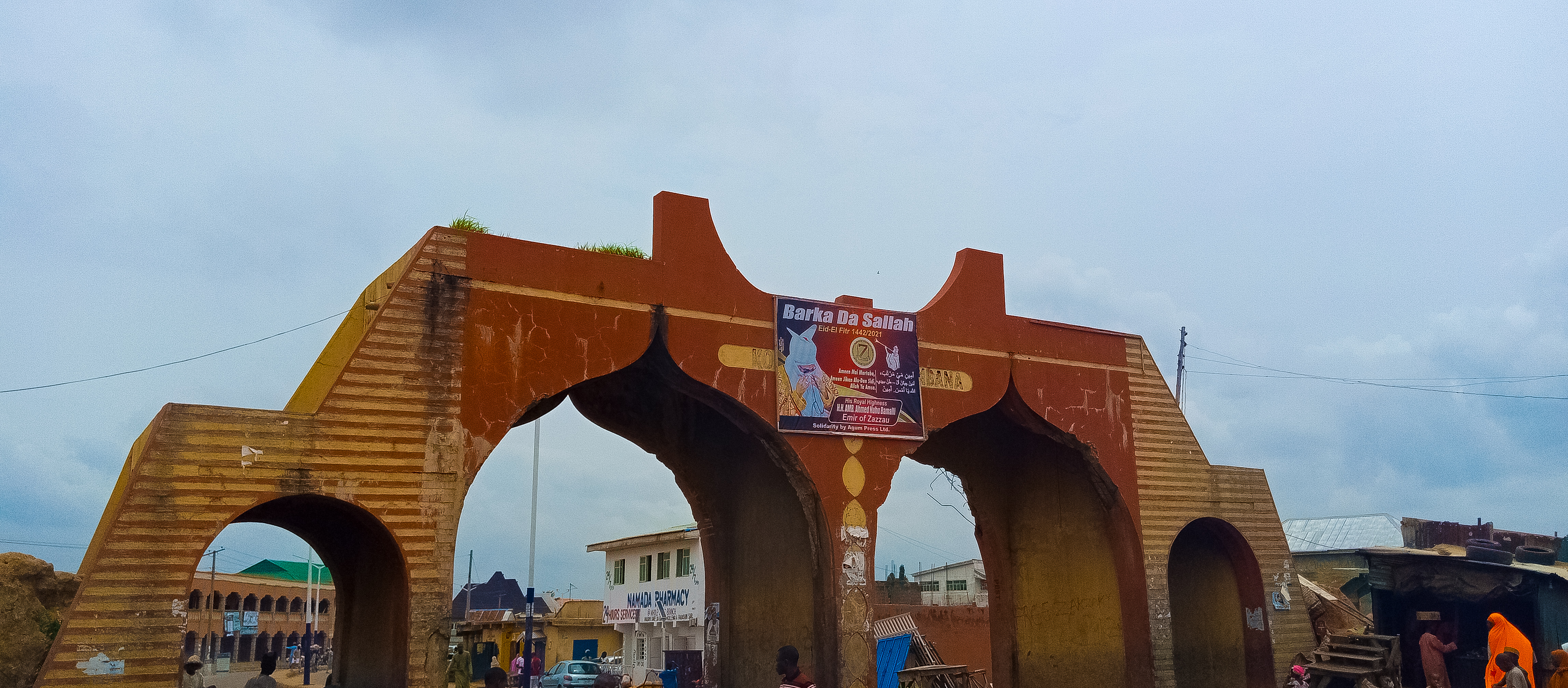

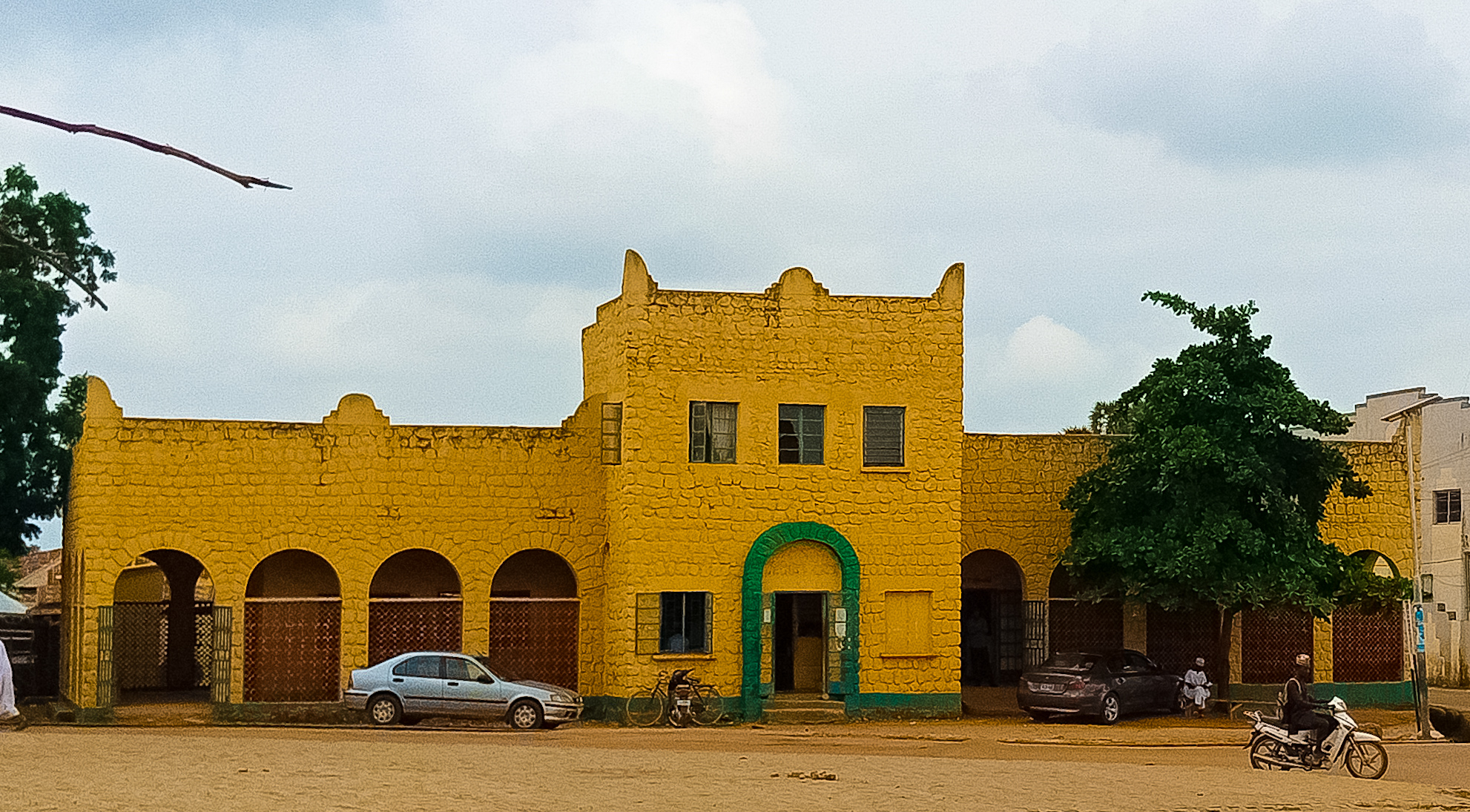

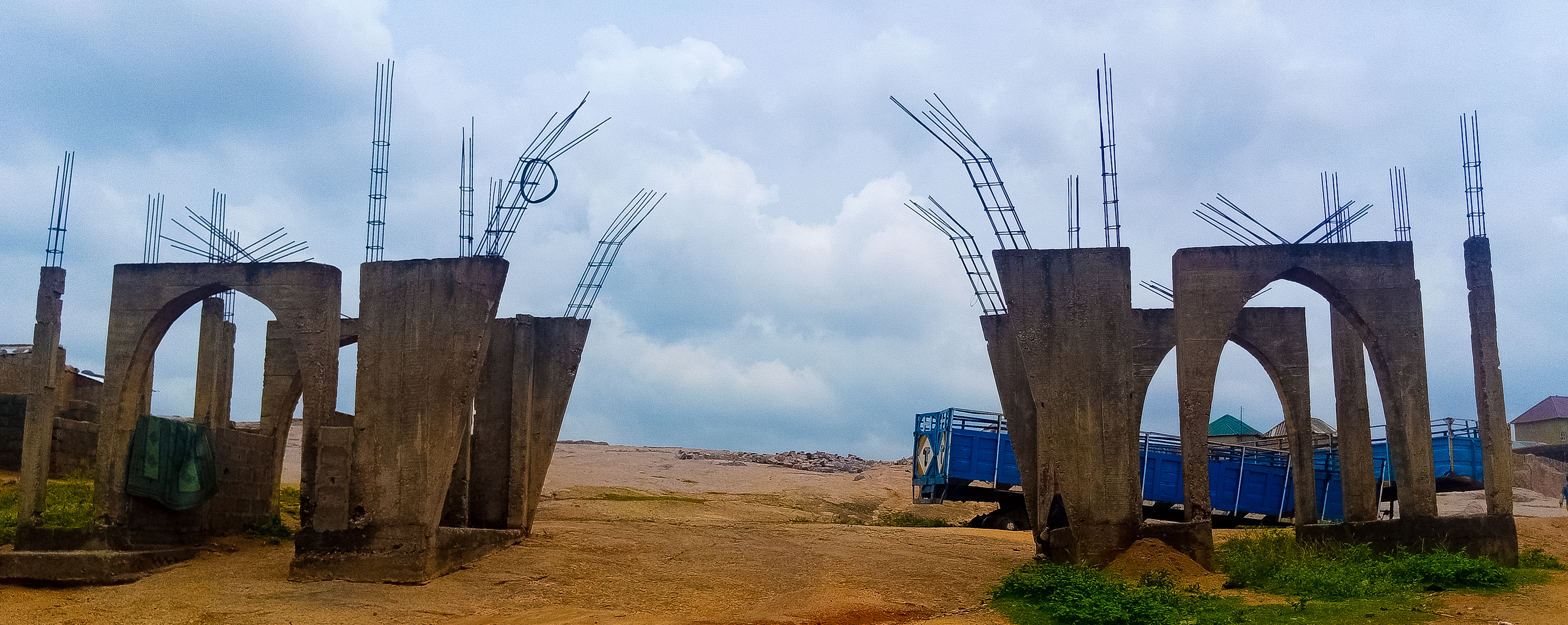

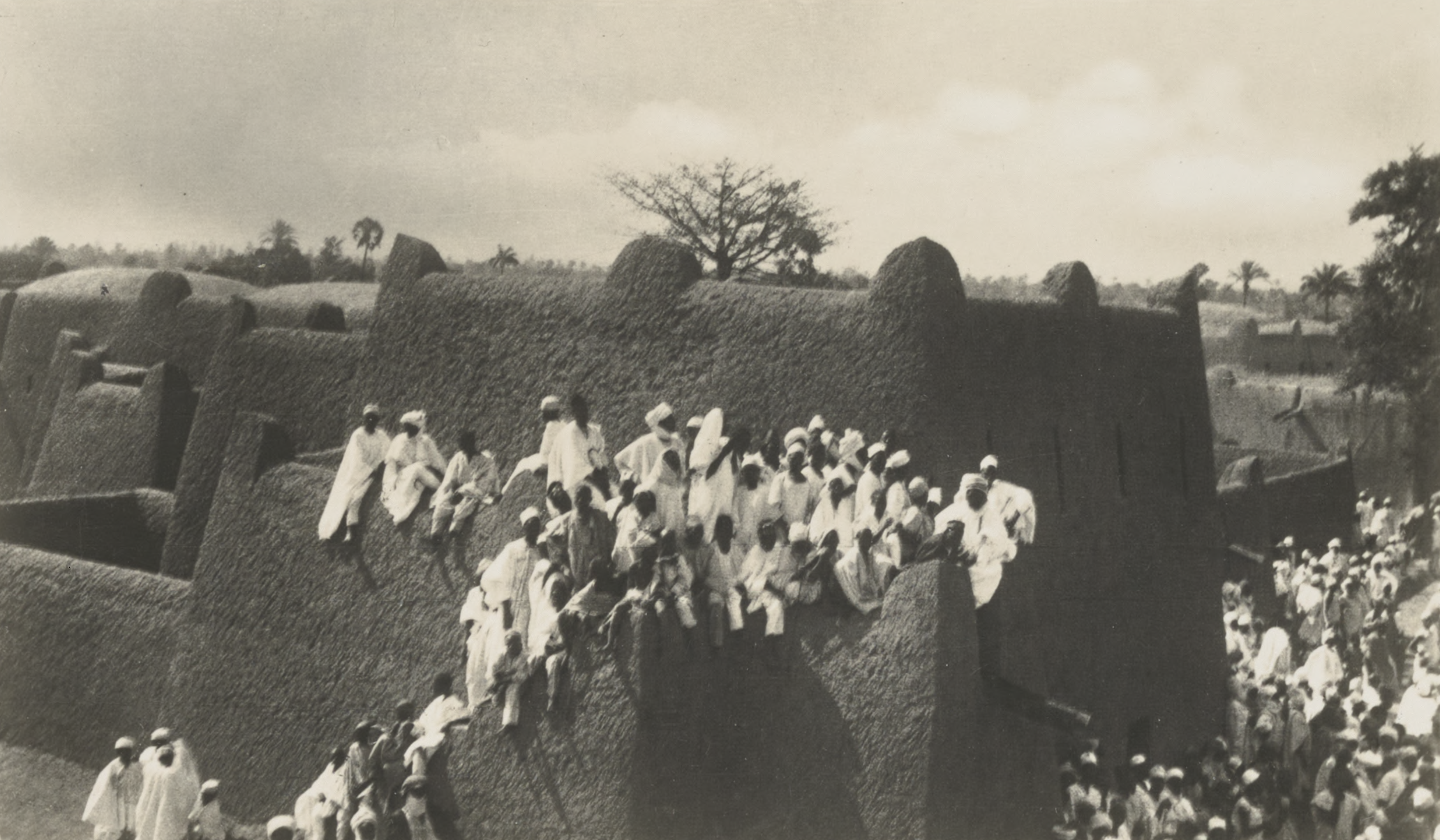

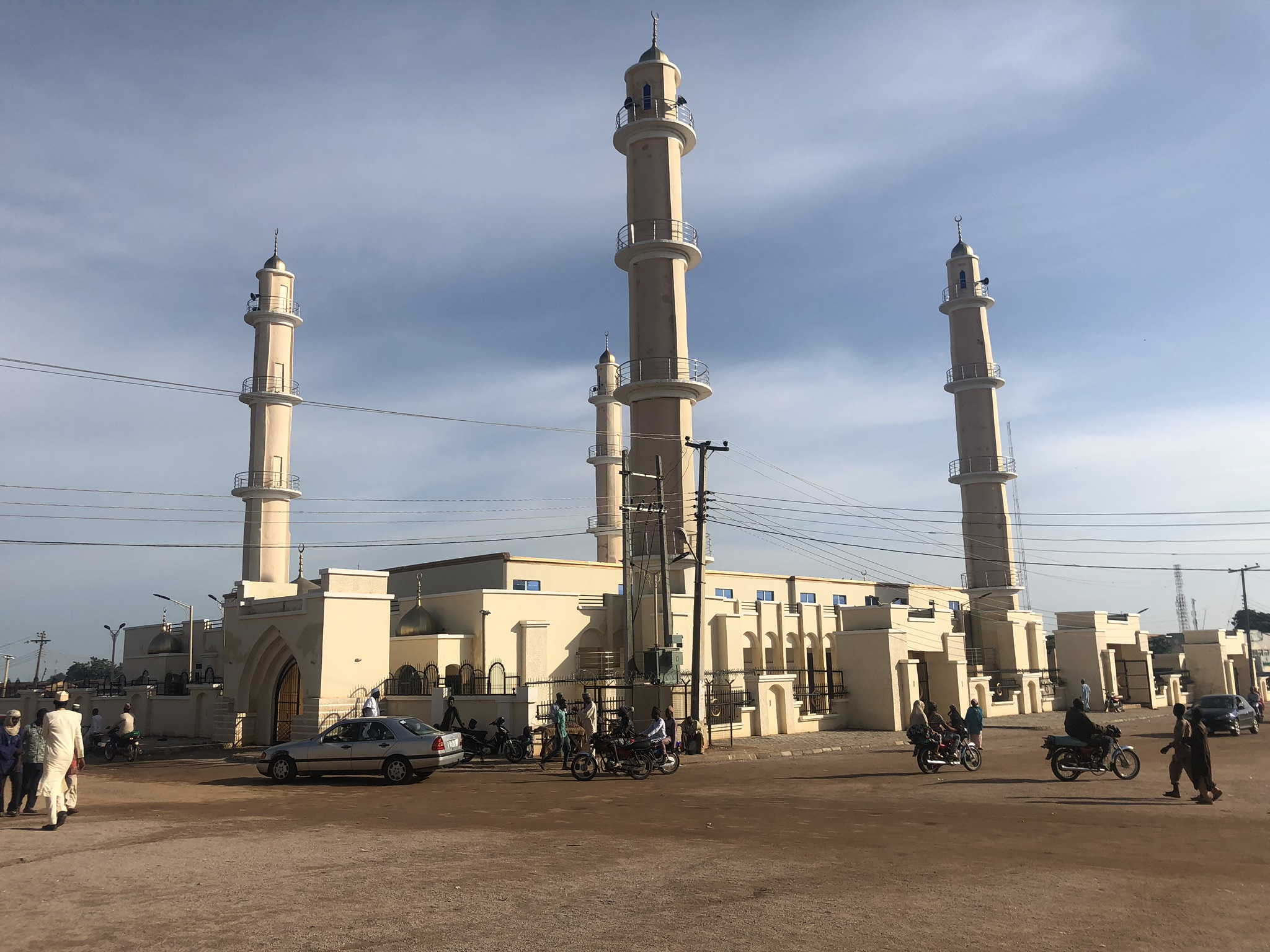

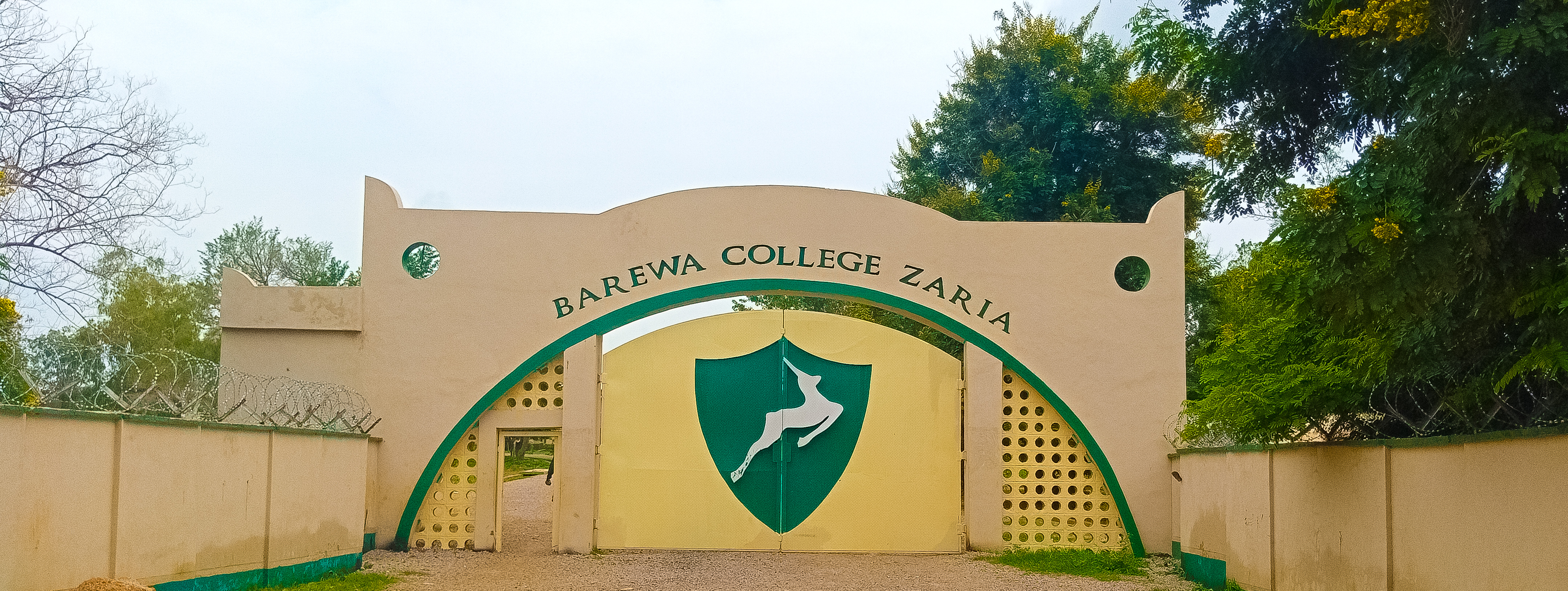

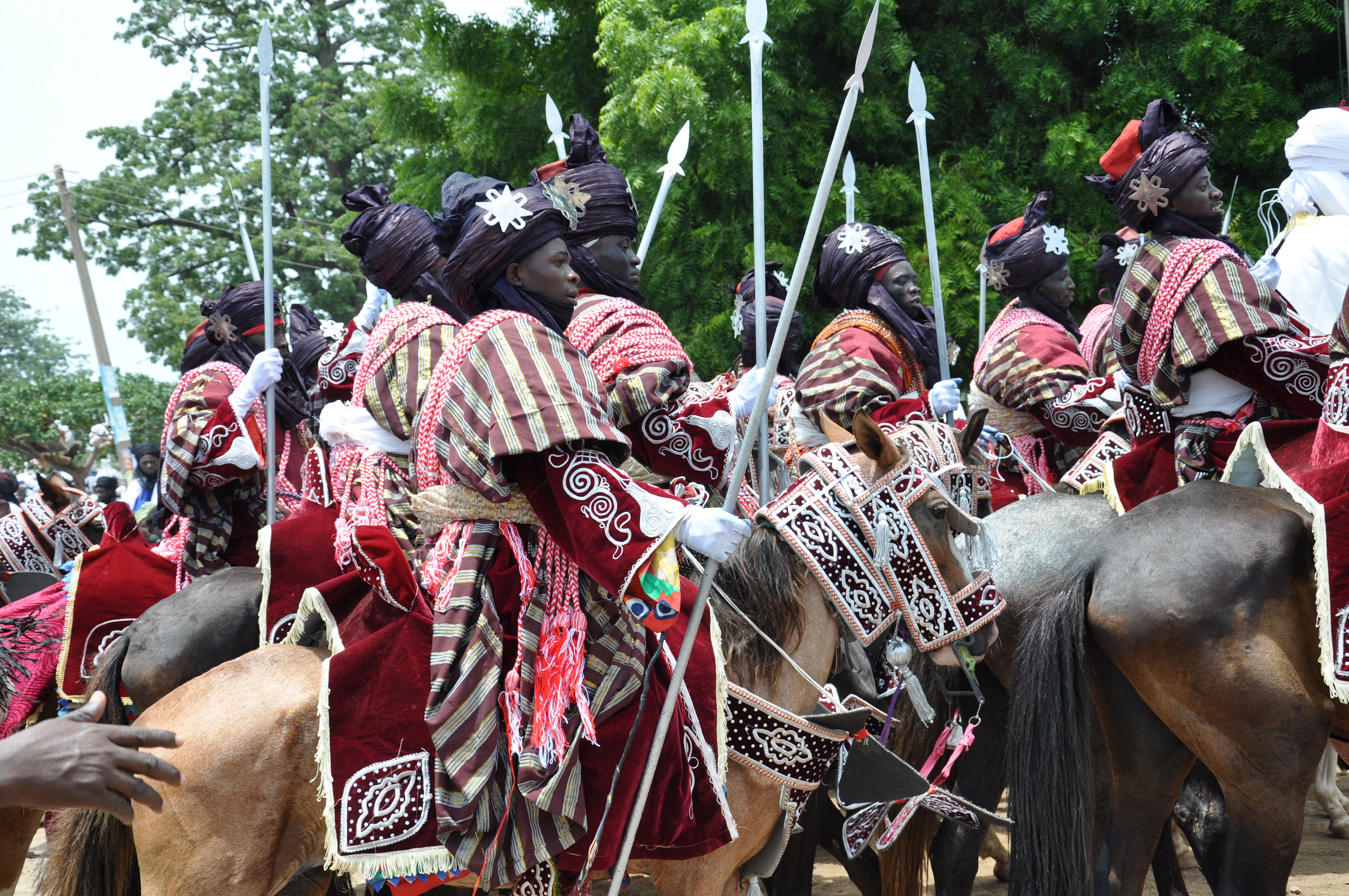

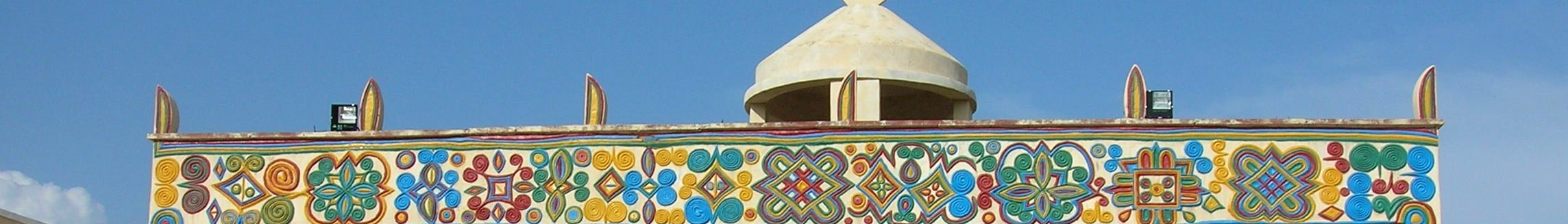

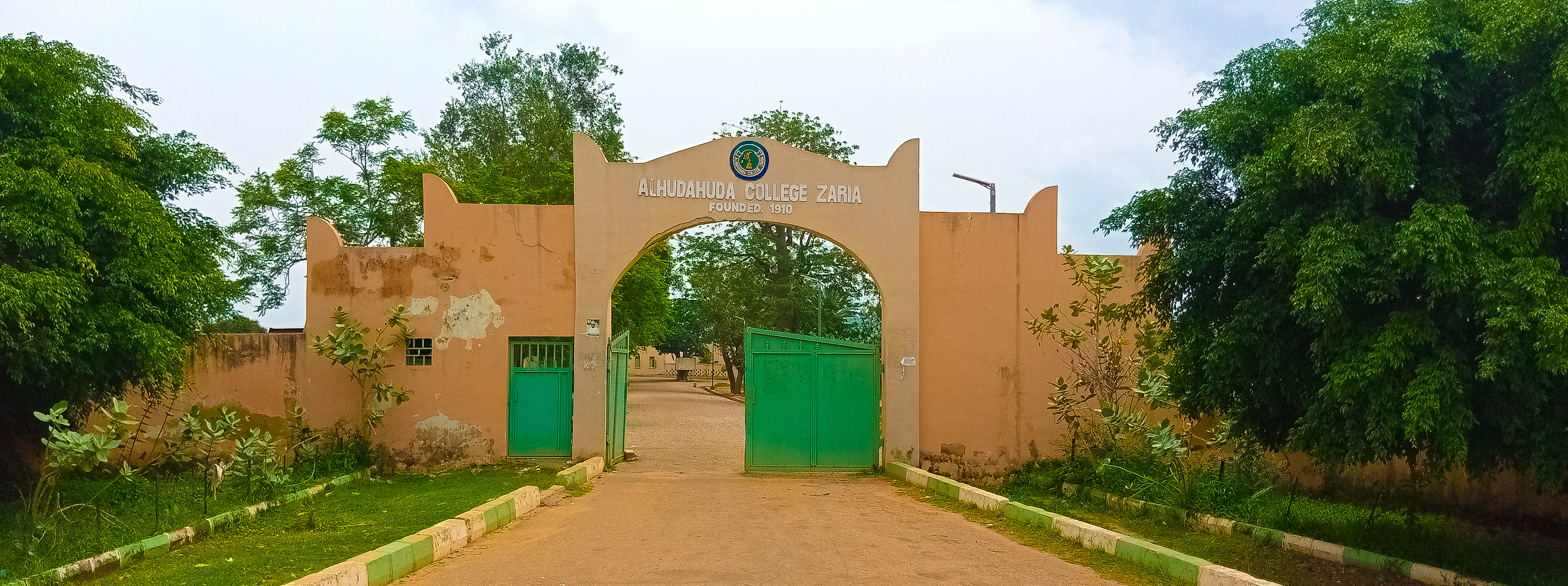

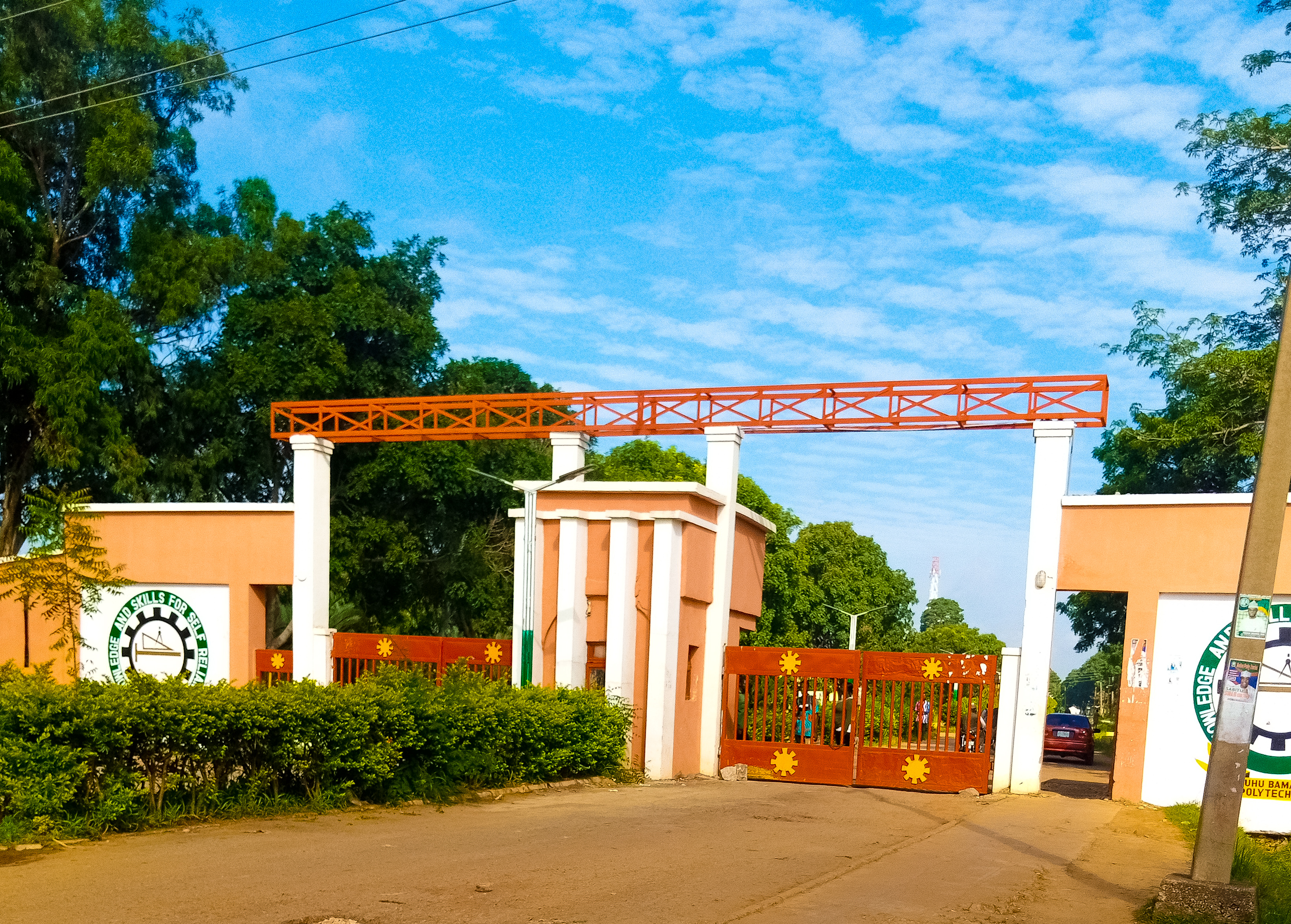

== See also ==
- Railway stations in Nigeria

== Bibliography ==
- Smith, Michael G. (1960) Government in Zazzau 1800–1950 International African Institute by the Oxford University Press, London, OCLC 293592; reprinted in 1964 and 1970.
- Dan Isaacs (28 September 2010). "Nigeria's emirs: Power behind the throne". BBC News.
