= List of Nigerian actors =

This is a list of notable Nigerian actors.

== Actors ==
- Abubakar Bashir Maishadda
- Adam A. Zango
- Adam Garba
- Adebayo Salami
- Adewale Akinnuoye-Agbaje
- Ado Gwanja
- Afeez Oyetoro
- Akin Lewis
- Ali Jita
- Ali Artwork
- Alex Ekubo
- Alex Usifo
- Ali Nuhu
- Amaka Umeh
- Aminu Shariff
- Aminu Saira
- Aminu Baba Ari
- Antar Laniyan
- Ayo Makun
- Babatunde Omidina
- Bimbo Manuel
- Blossom Chukwujekwu
- Bob-Manuel Udokwu
- Bovi
- Broda Shaggi
- Charles Inojie
- Chet Anekwe
- Chidi Mokeme
- Chinedu Ikedieze
- Chiwetel Ejiofor
- Chiwetalu Agu
- Chris Okagbue
- Clem Ohameze
- Damson Idris
- Daniel Etim Effiong
- David Oyelowo
- Dayo Okeniyi
- Dede One Day
- Dele Odule
- Desmond Elliot
- Deyemi Okanlawon
- Doris Simeon
- Efa Iwara
- Emeka Enyiocha
- Emeka Ike
- Emeka Ossai
- Falalu A Dorayi
- Falz
- Femi Adebayo
- Femi Branch
- Femi Jacobs
- Francis Duru
- Francis Odega
- Fred Amata
- Funso Adeolu
- Gbemisola Adeoti
- Hakeem Kae-Kazim
- Hanks Anuku
- Ibrahim Yekini
- Ifeanyi Emmanuel Igboke
- Ime Bishop Umoh
- Jide Kene Achufusi
- Jide Kosoko
- Jim Iyke
- Jimmie Akinsola
- Jimoh Aliu
- John Boyega
- John Okafor
- Joseph Benjamin
- Kanayo O. Kanayo
- Ken Erics
- Kenneth Okonkwo
- Kola Oyewo
- Kunle Remi
- Lateef Adedimeji
- Malam Nata'ala
- Mike Bamiloye
- Mike Ezuruonye
- Mr Macaroni
- Muyiwa Ademola
- Nazifi Asnanic
- Nkem Owoh
- Nonso Diobi
- Nuhu Abdullahi
- Nura M Inuwa
- O. C. Ukeje
- Odunlade Adekola
- Okey Bakassi
- Olu Jacobs
- Olumide Oworu
- Olumide Bakare
- Onuora Abuah
- Osita Iheme
- Pete Edochie
- Ramsey Nouah
- Richard Mofe Damijo
- Rotimi Salami
- Saheed Balogun
- Saint Obi
- Sam Dede
- Segun Arinze
- Sola Fosudo
- Sunday Omobolanle
- Taiwo Hassan
- Timini Egbuson
- Tobi Bakre
- Tobi Makinde
- Tope Tedela
- Tosin Igho
- Toyin Adewale
- Uzee Usman
- Uzor Arukwe
- Victor Osuagwu
- Wale Ojo
- Wasiu Alabi Pasuma
- Wole Ojo
- Yemi Ajibade
- Yemi Shodimu
- Yinka Quadri
- Yomi Fash-Lanso
- Yul Edochie
- Zack Orji
- Zubby Michael
- Zulu Adigwe

== Actresses ==
- Abimbola Craig
- Abiodun Duro-Ladipo
- Adebimpe Oyebade
- Adesua Etomi-Wellington
- Adunni Ade
- Alex Asogwa
- Alex Lopez
- Amal Umar
- Amina Amal
- Annie Macaulay-Idibia
- Ayo Adesanya
- Beverly Naya
- Beverly Osu
- Bimbo Ademoye
- Bimbo Oshin
- Biola Adebayo
- Bisi Komolafe
- Bukky Wright
- Carmen Ejogo
- Carol King
- Caroline Danjuma
- Chika Ike
- Chioma Chukwuka
- Chioma Okoye
- Clarion Chukwura
- Darasimi Nadi
- Dolly Nwaduba
- Dorcas Shola-Fapson
- Efe Irele
- Empress Njamah
- Eucharia-Anunobi Ekwu
- Fathia Balogun
- Folake Olowofoyeku
- Funke Akindele
- Gbubemi Ejeye
- Genevieve Nnaji
- Genoveva Umeh
- Hadiza Gabon
- Hafsat Idris
- Helen Paul
- Hilda Dokubo
- Idowu Philips
- Ini Edo
- Iyabo Ojo
- Jamila Nagudu
- Jennifer Eliogu
- Joke Silva
- Kate Henshaw
- Kehinde Bankole
- Kiki Omeili
- Lilian Bach
- Lilian Esoro
- Lisa Omorodion
- Liz Benson
- Liz Da-Silva
- Lola Margaret
- Maryam Yahaya
- Mary Lazarus
- Mary Uranta
- Megalyn Echikunwoke
- Mercy Aigbe
- Mercy Johnson
- Moji Olaiya
- Momee Gombe
- Monalisa Chinda
- Muma Gee
- Nafisa Abdullahi
- Nancy Isime
- Ngozi Ezeonu
- Nikki Amuka-Bird
- Nkiru Sylvanus
- Nse Ikpe Etim
- Oge Okoye
- Oghenekaro Itene
- Omotola Jalade Ekeinde
- Osas Ighodaro
- Patience Ozokwor
- Racheal Oniga
- Rahama Sadau
- Rashida Adamu Abdullah
- Regina Askia
- Regina Daniels
- Rita Dominic
- Rita Nzelu
- Rosaline Meurer
- Rukayya Dawayya
- Ruth Kadiri
- Sandra Achums
- Shan George
- Sharon Ooja
- Simi Drey
- Sola Sobowale
- Sophie Okonedo
- Stella Damasus
- Steph-Nora Okere
- Stephanie Okereke Linus
- Taiwo Ajai Lycett
- Tamara Eteimo
- Tomi Odunsi
- Toni Tones
- Tonto Dikeh
- Toyin Abraham
- Uche Jumbo
- Uyoyou Adia
- Uzo Aduba
- Weruche Opia
- Yvonne Jegede
- Yvonne Orji

== See also ==
- Cinema of Nigeria
