= List of Kannywood actors =

These are list of actors in Kannywood film industry.

== A ==
- Adam A. Zango
- Ali Nuhu
- Abubakar Bashir Maishadda
- Ado Gwanja
- Ali Jita
- Ali Artwork
- Amal Umar
- Amina Amal
- Aminu Shariff
- Aminu Saira
- Aminu Baba Ari

== D ==
- Diamond Zahra

== H ==
- Hadiza Aliyu
- Hafsat Idris
- Halima Atete

== K ==
- Kamal Aboki

== L ==
- Lilin Baba

== M ==
- Maryam Booth
- Maryam Yahaya
- Momee Gombe
- Mansur Makeup

== N ==
- Nuhu Abdullahi
- Nafisat Abdullahi
- Nura M Inuwa
- Nazifi Asnanic

== R ==
- Rabilu Musa
- Rahama Sadau
- Rashida Adamu Abdullah

== S ==
- Sadiq Sani Sadiq
- Sani Musa Danja
- Saratu Gidado

== U ==
- Usman Baba Pategi
- Umar Gombe
- Uzee Usman

== Y ==
- Yakubu Muhammad
