= Aminu Saira =

Nigerian filmmaker, director, and screenwriter (born 1979)

- Born: Aminu Muhammad Ahmad; 20 April 1979 (age 47); Gwammaja, Kano, Nigeria
- Education: Quranic Science
- Alma mater: Aminu Kano College of Islamic Legal Studies, Kano, Nigeria
- Occupations: Filmmaker, director, story writer, and screen player
- Years active: 2006–present
- Notable credit: Aminu Saira is best known for his film series Labarina
- Awards: See below

Aminu Muhammad Ahmad (born April 20, 1979), professionally known as Aminu Saira, is a Nigerian filmmaker, director, and screenwriter. His work includes films such as Jamila Da Jamilu (2009), Ga Duhu Ga Haske (2010), and Ashabul Kahfi (2014), which collectively earned him the distinction of Best Director of the Year at the 2015 Kannywood Awards (Jurors' Choice). In 2020, Saira launched the first Hausa language home video series, titled Labarina.

== Early life and education ==
Saira was born in Gwammaja, Kano State, Nigeria. His father Muhammad was an elderly statesman. Saira grew up in the Kano metropolis with his two brothers and studied Quranic science at the Aminu Kano College of Islamic Legal Studies.

== Career ==
Saira worked as a businessman before entering the Kannywood film industry in 2006 with his debut film, Musnadi. He directed, wrote, and produced Dare Da Yawa (2007), Jamila Da Jamilu (2009), and Ga Duhu Ga Haske (2010). He continues to write and direct under his production name, Saira Movies.

== Personal life ==
On 31 July 2026, Saira married a second wife in a ceremony held in Azare, Bauchi State, attended by colleagues, fans, and Kannywood industry stakeholders from across northern Nigeria. Photos of Saira with both of his wives subsequently circulated widely on social media, prompting discussion among Kannywood fans about polygamy and family life.

== Filmography ==
Year	Title	Role	Actors	Studio
2006	Musnadi	Director	Safiya Musa, Abba Al-Mustapha, Ibrahim Maishunku	Saira Movies
2007	Almajira	Director	Ibrahim Maishunku, Safiya Musa, Aminu Shariff, Abba Al-Mustapha	Saira Movies
2007	Dare Da Yawa	Director	Ibrahim Maishunku, Ali Nuhu, Kubra Dako,	Saira Movies
2008	Garin Mu Da Zafi	Director	Ali Nuhu, Adam A. Zango, Maryam Booth, Zainab Abdullahi	UK Entertainment
2009	Jamila Da Jamilu	Director	Ibrahim Maishunku, Jamila Nagudu	Saira Movies
2009	Mai Gadon Zinare	Director	Ali Nuhu, Jamila Umar Nagudu, Ibrahim Maishunku	Saira Movies
2010	Ladidin Baba	Director	Ali Nuhu, Zainab Umar	UK Entertainment
2010	Jidda	Director	Ibrihim Maishunku, Jamila Umar Nagudu, Ishaq Sidi Ishaq	Square Media
2010	Dan Sarki	Director	Ali Nuhu, Zainab Umar, Hajara Usman, Musa Abdullahi	Kabugawa Production
2010	Ga Duhu Ga Haske	Director	Adam A Zango, Zainab Abdullahi, Zainab Umar	Saira Movies
2010	Miyatti Allah	Director	Ibrahim Maishunku, Fati KK, Binta Yahaya	G-Top Multimedia
2010	Rai Da Rai	Director	Ibrahim Maishunku, Rashida Abdullahi, Fati KK	T.M.A Production
2010	Balaraba	Director	Baballe Hayatu, Adam A Zango, Sadiya Gyale	Square Media
2010	Walijam	Director	Adam A Zango, Zainab Abdullahi, Audu Kano	UK Entertainment
2010	Mata Da Miji	Director	Ibrahim Maishunku, Binta Yahaya, Fati K. K., Rufaida Muhammad	G-Top Multimedia
2010	Dadin Baki	Director	Ibrahim Maishunku, Jamila Umar	Kabugawa Production
2011	Sarauta	Director	Ali Nuhu, Rahma Hassan, Hadiza Muhammad, Kabiru Mai Kaba	T.M.A Production
2011	Malika	Director	Ali Nuhu, Nafisa Abdullahi, Rabiu Rikadawa, Hadiza Muhammad	Saira Movies
2011	Laifin Dadi	Director	Shu'aibu Lawal, Adam A Zango, Nafisa Abdullahi	G-Top Multimedia
2011	Ban Saketa Ba	Director	Ibrahim Maishunku, Fati KK	Kabugawa Production
2011	Maryam Diyana	Director	Rahama Hassan, Hauwa Maina, Ali Nuhu, Sadiq Sani Sadiq	UK Entertainment
2011	Ajnabiyya	Director	Ibrahim Maishunku, Zainab Abdullahi, Rahama Hassan	UK Entertainment
2012	Mutallab	Director	Ali Nuhu, Adam A Zango, Nafisa Abdullahi, Carmain McCain, Kabiru Nakwango	Square Media
2012	'Yar Agadez	Director	Zainab Abdullahi, Ibrahim Maishunku, Nafisa Abdullahi, Adam A Zango	UK Entertainment
2012	Dan Marayan Zaki	Director	Nafisa Abdullahi, Sadiq Sani Sadiq, Rahama Hassan, Hadiza Muhammad, Sadiq Ahmad	Saira Movies
2012	Kara Da Kiyashi	Director	Ali Nuhu, Hadiza Muhammad, Bashir Nayaya, Nafisa Abdullahi	UK Entertainment
2012	Ban Sani Ba	Director	Hadiza Aliyu, Shehu Hassan Kano, Shu'aibu Lawan	T.M.A Production
2012	Toron Giwa	Director	Ali Nuhu, Nafisa Abdullahi, Shu'aibu Lawal	Asnanic Movies
2012	Kona Gari	Director	Ali Nuhu, Maryam Muhammad, Halima Atete, Hauwa Waraka	T.M.A Production
2013	Fisabilillah	Director	Ali Nuhu, Nafisa Abdullahi, Hadiza Muhammad, Rabi'u Rikadawa	G-Top Multimedia
2013	Lamiraj	Director	Rahama Hassan, Ali Nuhu, Nafisa Abdullahi	Saira Movies
2013	Dakin Amarya	Director	Ali Nuhu, Halima Atete, A'isha Aliyu	Asnanic Movies
2013	Fari Da Baki	Director	Rahama Hassan, Al-Amin Buhari, Ali Nuhu	G-Top Multimedia
2013	Farin Dare	Director	Ali Rabi'u, Bello Muhammad Bello, Rahama Sadau	UK Entertainment
2014	Kanin Miji	Director	Ali Nuhu, Jamila Umar, Nuhu Abdullahi	Saira Movies
2014	Kisan Gilla	Director	Sadiq Sani Sadiq, Hadiza Aliyu, Rahama Sadau, Bello Muhammad Bello	Asmasan Pictures
2014	Ashabul Kahfi	Director	Tahir Fagge, Tijjani Faraga, Al-Amin Buhari	Saira Movies
2014	Daga Ni Sai Ke	Director	Sadiq Ahmad, Zaharadden Sani, Sadiq Sani Sadiq, Hadiza Aliyu, Halima Atete	Saira Movies
2014	Haske	Director	Aina'u Ade, Ali Nuhu, Ali Rabiu, Abbas Sadiq	Saira Movies
2014	Kalamu Wahid	Director	Nafisa Abdullahi, Sadiq Ahmad, Ali Nuhu	Kabugawa Production
2014	'Ya Daga Allah	Director	Ali Nuhu, Nafisa Abdullahi, Fati Abdullahi. Sadiq Sani Saqid, Hadiza Muhammad	Saira Movies
2014	Ali Yaga Ali	Director	Ali Nuhu, Hadiza Aliyu, Sadiq Sani Saqid, Jamila Umar	Kabugawa Production
2015	Baya Da Kura	Director	Ali Nuhu, Nuhu Abdullahi, Ishaq Sidi Ishaq, Fati Washa, Hadiza Muhammad	GG Production
2015	Wani Zama	Director	Yakubu Muhammad, Jamila Umar, Shehu Hassan Kano	Asnanic Movies
2015	Uwa Tafi Uwa	Director	Ali Nuhu, Hadiza Aliyu	Mikiya Production
2015	Gidan Kitso	Director	Ali Nuhu, Jamila Umar, Fati Abdullahi	Kabugawa Production
2016	Jarumta	Director	Ali Nuhu, Hadiza Aliyu, Jamila Umar, Hauwa Waraka, Nuhu Abdullahi	G-Top Multimedia
2016	Kallo Ya Koma Sama	Director	Ali Nuhu, Jamila Umar, Baballe Hayatu	Saira Movies
2021	Labarina	Director	Sarkin waƙa, Rabi'u Rikadawa etc.	Saira Movies
2026	Dare Ɗaya	Director	Mai Shunku, Yakubu Mohammed	Saira Movies

== Honors and awards ==
Year	Award	Category	Film	Result
2013	Entrepreneurship Award	Best Director	Special Recognition	Won
2013	Kannywood/AMMA Awards	Best Movie Director	Dakin Amarya	Won
2014	1st Kannywood Awards	Best Director of the Year (Jurors Choice Awards)	Wata Hudu	Won
2014	Kannywood/AMMA Awards	Best Director (Popular Choice Awards)	Ali Yaga Ali	Won
2015	2nd Kannywood/MTN Awards	Best Director of the Year (Jurors Choice Awards)	Ashabul Kahfi & Sabuwar Sangaya	Won
2015	Kannywood/AMMA Awards	Best Director (Popular Choice Awards)	Baya Da Kura	Won

Saira was also awarded the best director award by the Arewa Music and Movies Awards. In 2015, Saira was awarded the Best Kannywood Director.

== See also ==
- IMDb
- List of Nigerian actors
- List of Nigerian film directors
- List of Kannywood actors
