= Bello Sisqo =

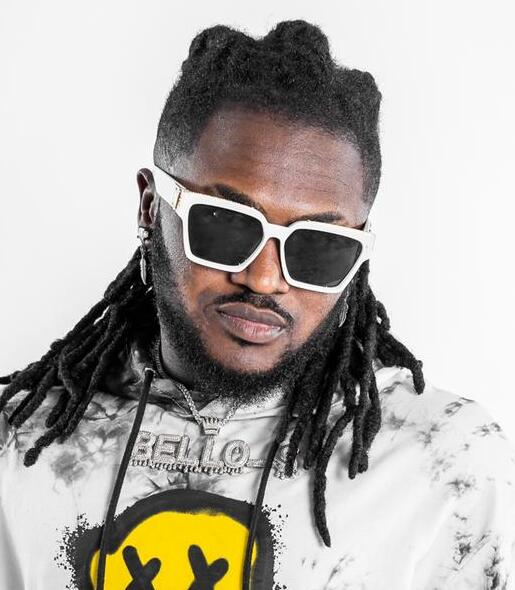
- Bello Sisqo in 2021

Background information
- Born: Abubakar Bello Shariff; November 1, 1998 (age 27); Maiduguri, Nigeria
- Occupations: Music, Songwriter, Choreographer

Bello Abubakar Shariff, born on 1 November 1998, and known in the entertainment industry as Bello Sisqo, is a German singer, dancer, songwriter, and music director, originally from Maiduguri, Nigeria. Bello has choreographed and instructed dance for many of Ali Nuhu and Adam A. Zango's films. He later collaborated with the renowned Nigerian singer Chizo Germany on the song Fada Da Gaskiya. In 2024, Bello released the album Naija to Germany, featuring various artists such as DJ AB, Ali Jita, Ado Gwanja, and Umar M Shareef. He is currently a traditional Hausa dance tutor in Germany.
