= Ummi Ibrahim =

Kannywood actress (born 1983)

- Born: 1983 (age 42–43); Borno State
- Citizenship: Nigeria
- Education: Bayero University Kano
- Occupations: Kannywood actress, Musician, Business woman
- Years active: 2001 – present

Ummi Ibrahim, also known as Ummi Zeezee, is a Nigerian actress. She often appears in Kannywood films, she rose to prominence in the film Jinsi, where she got her nickname Zeezee.

== Career ==
There is controversy about the actress in the industry as she claims superiority. This sparked reaction among her colleague since she was last seen in the Kannywood in 2006.

== Personal life ==
Ummi was rumored to have dated the former head of state, General Ibrahim Babangida. She confirmed they are still friends in an interview with an online newspaper.

The Kannywood actress was also an ex-girlfriend to Timaya, the musician from Benue state.

The actress was duped of 450 million by fraudsters after a man who posed as a business partner brought a deal of crude oil. She was consoled by fans and colleague since she contemplated suicide after the incident.

Ummi prided herself in that she doesn't put on makeup since her natural beauty is enough.

== Filmography ==
- Jinsi
- Flag of Love
- Yan uwa
- Gambiza
- Gender

== See also ==
- Hadizu Aliyu
- Halimah Atete
- Hauwa Maina
