= Hauwa Maina =

Kannywood actress and producer

- Born: Borno State
- Citizenship: Nigeria
- Education: Kaduna Polytechnic
- Occupations: Kannywood actress, Producer
- Years active: 1998-2018
- Children: 2

Hauwa Maina was a Nigerian Kannywood actress and producer who featured in the film Queen Amina of Zazzau. She died of an undisclosed illness at a hospital in Kano on 2 May 2018.

== Career ==
She was the secretary-general of the local Hausa association of female producers. Her first appearance was in Tuba and she later featured in Bayajida, a historical film used in schools for educational purposes. She owned a production company known as Ma'inta Enterprises Limited, which produced several films, including Gwaska and Sarauniya Amina.

== Filmography ==
- Tuba
- Queen Amina of Zazzau
- Bayajida
- Sarauniya Amina
- Gwaska and Maina (2015)
- Dry (2015)
- Akwai Dalili (2016)

== Nominations and awards ==
- Best Afro Nollywood Award in London, 2007.
- Best Actress at the SIM Awards, 2010.

== See also ==
- Halimah Atete
- Ali Artwork
- Lucy Ameh
