= Hafsat Idris =

Nigerian actress (born 1987)

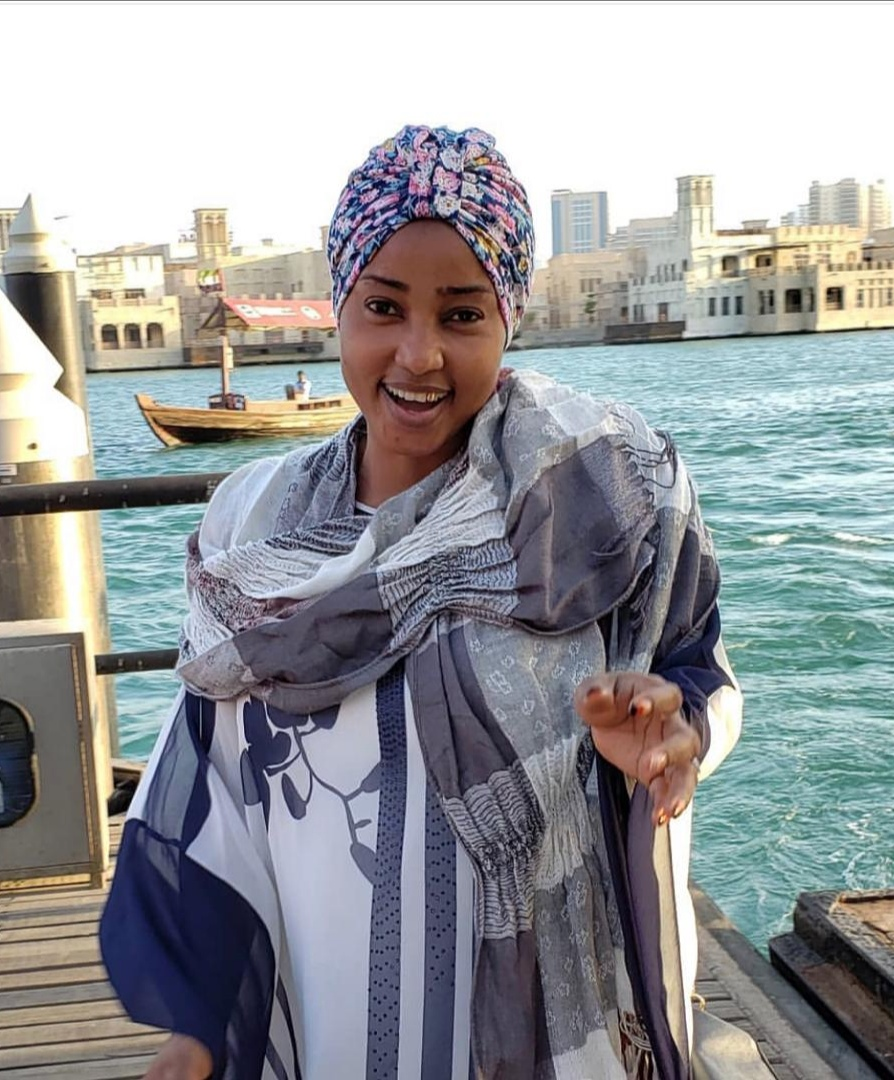
- Born: Hafsat Ahmad Idris; 14 July 1987 (age 39); Shagamu, Nigeria
- Occupations: Actress; filmmaker
- Years active: 2015–present
- Known for: Appearance in Barauniya

Hafsat Ahmad Idris (born 14 July 1987) is a Nigerian film actress in the Kannywood film industry. She participated in her first movie called Barauniya (2016). She won the 2019 female actress award. She has worked with prominent actors such as Sani Danja, Aisha Humairah, Ali Nuhu

== Early life and career ==
Hafsat is an indigene of Kano State, in northern Nigeria. She was born and raised in Shagamu, Ogun State. She made her first appearance in Kannywood in a movie titled Barauniya, she featured alongside Ali Nuhu, and Jamila Nagudu.

In 2018, Hafsat established a film production company known as Ramlat Investment. She produced a number of movies in 2019 including Kawaye which had actors such as Ali Nuhu, Sani Musa Danja and herself. She cleared the air that she is not married to Abacha's son.

== Awards ==
Year	Award	Category	Result
2017	City People Entertainment Awards	Most Promising Actress	Nominated
2018	City People Entertainment Awards	Best Actress	Won
2019	City People Entertainment Awards	Best Actress	Won
2019	City People Entertainment Awards	Face of Kannywood	Won

== Filmography ==
Hafsat has featured in numerous movies, including the following:

Title	Year	Role
Biki Buduri	ND	
Furuci	ND	
Labarina	ND	
Barauniya	2015	
Makaryaci	2015	
Abdallah	2016	
Ta Faru Ta Kare	2016	
Rumana	2016	
Da Ban Ganshi Ba	2016	
Dan Almajiri	2016	
Haske Biyu	2016	
Maimunatu	2016	
Mace Mai Hannun Maza	2016	
Wazir	2016	
Gimbiya Sailuba	2016	
Matar Mamman	2016	
Risala	2016	
Igiyar Zato	2016	
Wata Ruga	2017	
Rariya	2017	
Wacece Sarauniya	2017	
Zan Rayu Da Ke	2017	
Namijin Kishi	2017	Fa'izaa
Rigar Aro	2017	
Yar Fim	2017	
Dan Kurma	2017	
Kawayen Amarya	2017	
Dr Surayya	2018	
Algibla	2018	
Ana Dara Ga Dare Yayi	2018	
Mata Da Miji	2019	
Fillo	2019	
Kawaye	2019	Hidaya
Ana Dara Ga Dare	2018	Amina
Dr. Haleema	2019	
Kalan Dangi	2017	
Rariya	2017	Asama'u
Alkibla	2017	Lubna
Kalan Dangi	2017	

== See also ==
- List of Nigerian actors
- List of Nigerian film producers
- List of Kannywood actors
