= Fati Muhammad =

Nigerian actress (born 1982)

- Born: Fati Muhammad; 15 June 1982 (age 43); Tukuntawa, Kano
- Citizenship: Nigerian
- Occupations: Actress, filmmaker, politician
- Spouse: Divorced

Fati Muhammad is one of the famous and pioneer actress of Hausa film in the Northern Nigerian film industry popularly known as Kannywood. She is regarded as one of the successful Hausa Actresses in the early 2000s. She in 2001 was contracted by Society for Family Health (SFH) and produce a massive sensitization campaign against causes and managing HIV/AIDS. She was sponsored to United Kingdom until left voluntarily after 6 years and went back to Nigeria.

== Filmography ==
Fati started her film career from the time she first expressed her desire to enter the film industry at a young age of 15 then. She started by showing Tahir Muhammad Fagge, a well-known filmmaker in the Kannywood industry, about her interest in the film industry. Tahir introduced her to Ishaq Sidi Ishaq an acclaimed image maker in the industry. and Ishaq Sidi Ishaq cast Fati in his film "Da Babu", her role in beauty and style was further highlighted in the film where she was immediately recognized from the film. This attracted the attention of other producers in the industry who have repeatedly included Fati in their films. Fati has acted in many films. Among them are; Sangaya, Zarge, Marainiya, Mujadala, Kudiri, Tutar So, Garwashi, Tawakkali, Gasa, Abadan Da'iman, Zo mu Zauna, Tangarda, Hujja, Al'ajabi, Halacci, Samodara, Zumunci, Murmushin Alkawari, Gimbiya, Bakandamiya, Taskan Rayuwa, Nagoma and Babban Gari. Fati says she has stopped appearing in movies but is still making films.

== Personal life ==
Fati Muhammad married her co-actor Sani Mai Iska in 2002 and moved to UK with her husband for her SFH HIV/AIDS Project. A few years after their marriage broke down, Upon her return, she became involved in the film industry, but soon stopped after marrying Umar Kanu who is the senior brother to singer Ali Jita. After a while their marriage came to an end. Fati has no biological children but adopted a boy from an orphanage that lives with her to date named Muhammad Sani. In 2019 she anchored hopes at political rallies. Fati has made it clear that she is involved in politics.

Fati Muhammad was asked in an interview.(People say Hausa actresses hardly stay long in marriage?) and she said

I like this question. It is because the perception of us by the society is following us. Don’t say we don’t stay in marriage, please, say the contrary and pray for us. Some of us made success of their marriages. Even me, I want to marry again as quick as possible. I can stay in purdah if that is the wish of my husband. We are in Ramadan, a holy month, I am praying hard to get another person to marry.

— Blueprint Newspapers Limited, I'm successful but not lucky with marriage – Fati Mohammed, 17 February 2021
