= Mati a Zazzau =

- Directed by: Yaseen Auwal
- Written by: Yakubo M. Kumo
- Release date: 2020
- Country: Nigeria
- Language: Hausa

Mati a Zazzau ("Hausa" meaning "Death" in Zazzau) is a 2020 thriller drama from the Kannywood film industry written by Yakubo M. Kumo and directed by Yaseen Auwal. The film tells the story of greed, deceit and blackmail in the quest for wealth. The movie debut as the first Kannywood film on streaming platform Netflix.

== Plot ==
The plot follows a cunny man, Mati (Sadiq Sani Sadiq), who fled to the Kingdom of Zazzau to the village town of Sauda from the Kingdom of Rimau, after the death of his father, Alhaji Mudi Rimau. His father had left behind a vast fortune buried somewhere that Mati wants to recover. On his quest to locating the treasure, he is taken to Alhaji Sule, a bedridden man. At the verge of telling Mati where the treasure is located, Alhaji Sule experiences difficulty in talking. Desperate to get the location of the fortune, Mati enters into a deal with the village head, to get all means possible to get Alhaji Sule to speak.

== Cast ==
- Sadiq Sani Sadiq
- Rahama Sadau
- Adam A. Zango
- Di'Ja
- Tahir I. Tahir
- Rabiu Rikadawa
- Aminu Shariff Momo
- Jamila Umar Nagudu
