= Momee Gombe =

Kannywood Actress

Maimuna Gombe Abubakar
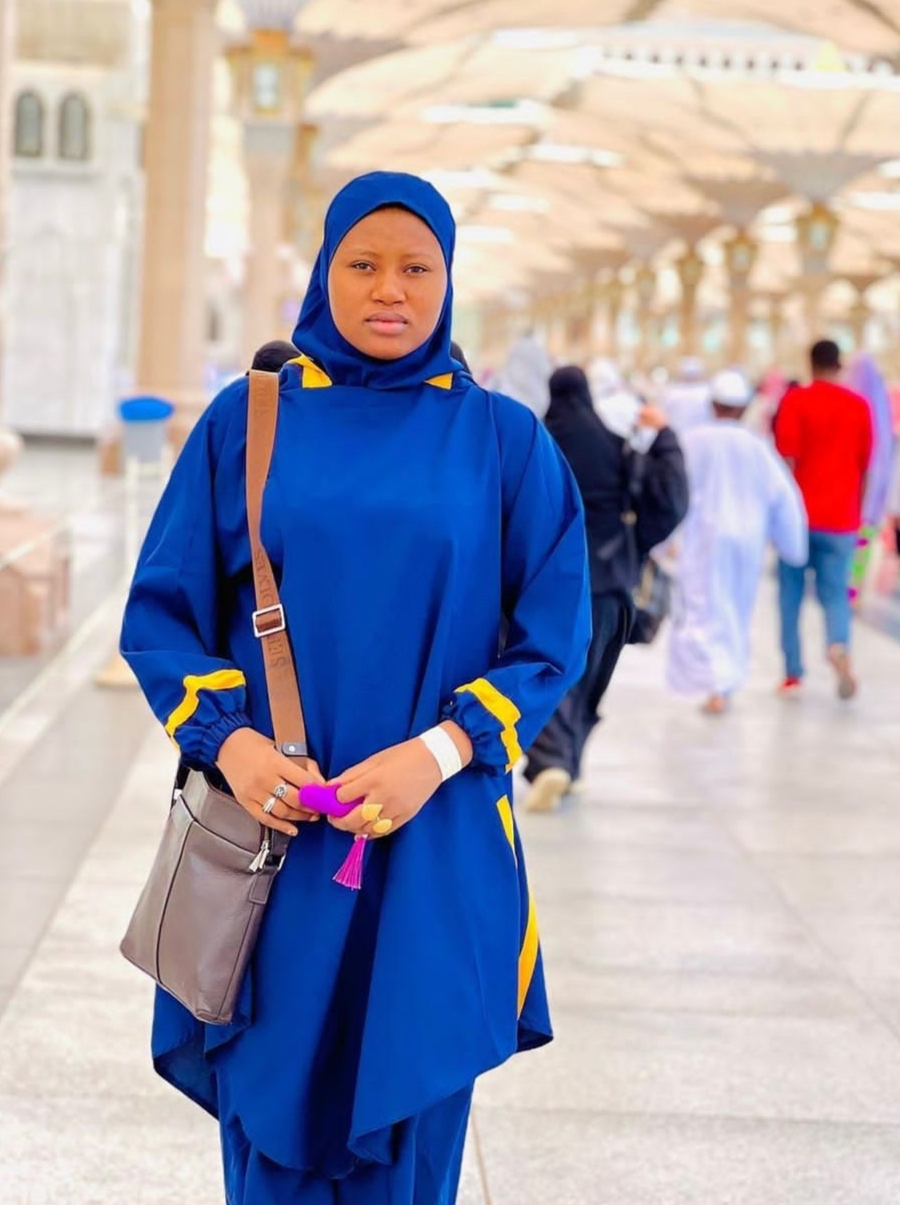
- Maimuna pictured at the Al-Masjid an-Nabawi
- Born: Maimuna Abubakar; 11 July 1999 (age 26); Gombe, Nigeria
- Other name: Momee Gombe
- Occupations: actress; dancer; singer
- Notable credit: Best known as a singer
- Spouse: Adam Fasaha (m. 2021; div. 2021)

Maimuna Gombe Abubakar popularly known as (Momee Gombe), is a Nigerian actress, singer and dancer working in Kannywood she has worked with prominent actors such as Ali Nuhu, Bilkisu Abdullahi, Zikrullah Abubakar, Sukairaju Yusuf.

== Life and career ==
Momee Gombe was born on 11 July 1999, in Gombe State, Nigeria. She attended primary and secondary school in Gombe. The actress is starring with Hausa musician and actor Adam A Zango who she mentions as her mentor in the Kannywood industry, followed by singer Hamisu Breaker, and singer and actor Garzali Miko and other young Hausa singers in Northern Nigeria.

== Personal life ==
Momme Gombe married popular Hausa singer Adam Fasaha in 2021, but the marriage ended in less than a month, with many speculating that it was due to her relationship with Hamisu Breaker.

== Films ==
She has appeared in over 30 films, of which there are:

- Kishin Mata
- Asalin Kaun
- Sabon Shafi (2008) as Maimuna
- Gidan Kashe Ahu (2020)
- Zainabu Abu (2021)
- Sarki Goma Zamani Goma (2021)
- Alaqa (2021 TV Series) as Halisa

== See also ==
- List of Nigerian actors
- List of Kannywood actors
