= Amina Amal =

Nigerian actress (born 1998)

Amina Muhammad popularly known as (Amina Amal or simply Amal), is a Cameroonian-born actress working in the Hausa language cinema known as Kannywood. She has worked with prominent actors and directors such as Adam A. Zango, Hadiza Gabon, and Falalu Dorayi. She came into the limelight with her first film, which earn her the nickname "Amal".

== Filmography ==
- Amal
- Hisabi
- Matan Aure
- Abu Hassan
- Basaja Gidan Yari
- Ramlat
