= Aisha Tsamiya =

Kannywood actress

Aisha Aliyu Tsamiya
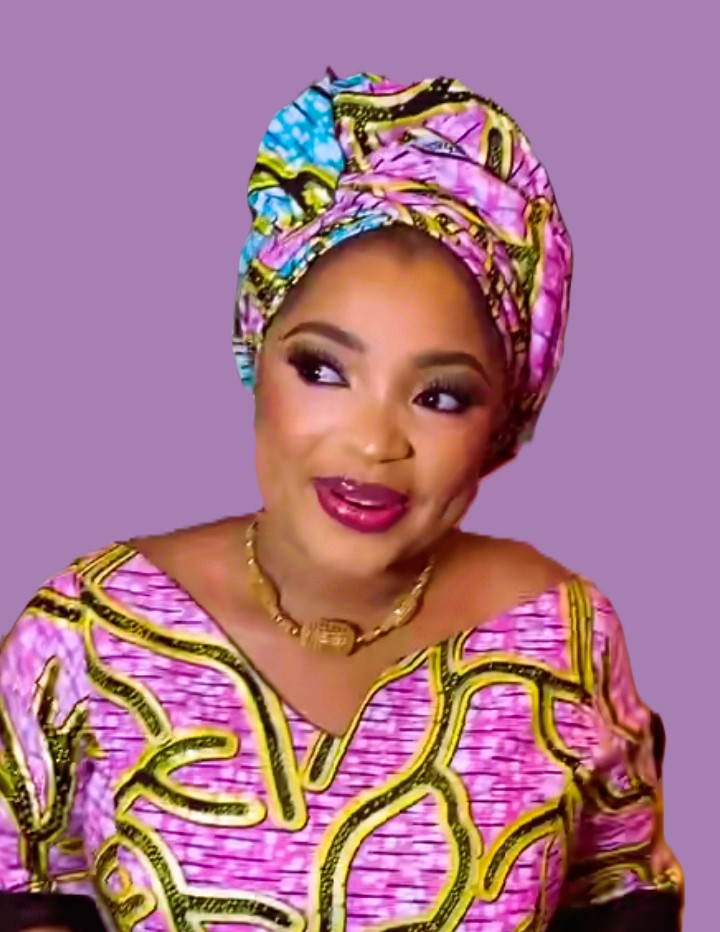
- Born: 1992 (age 33–34); Nassarawa, Kano
- Citizenship: Nigeria
- Education: North-West University
- Occupations: Film actress, producer, modelling, business woman
- Years active: 2011–present
- Children: 3

Aisha Aliyu, known by the stage name Aisha Aliyu Tsamiya, is a Kannywood actor and producer who came into the limelight with her first film, which earn her the nickname “Tsamiya”.

== Career ==
The actress featured in Zeenat (2014) as the lead, where she acted as the daughter of a rich father.

According to her interview with blueprint newspaper, the Kannywood actress ventured into business and modelling during the COVID break. She was into affiliate marketing, where fans used her influence to sell products. Aisha later established her beauty shop in Kano on Gwarzo Road.

== Filmography ==
- So
- Tsamiya
- Dakin Amarya
- Hanyar Kano
- Ranar Baiko
- Salma
- Zeenat
- Uzuri
- Husna
- Wakili (2019)
- Basaja Takun Karshe Asma'u (2015)
- Farin Dare as Halimab (2013)
- Carbon Kwai as Zubaida (2011)
- Mijin Biza as Aisha Aliyu (2017)
- Matar Mijina (2018)
- Rudani as Habiba (2018)
- Laila Adam as Laila (2018)
- Kanwar Dubarudu 2017
- Kalan Dangi 2017
- Akwai Dalili as Amarya (2016)
- Ana Dara Ga Dare as Maryam (2019)
- Wuff as Maman Siyama (2021)
- Ina Kika Je

== Personal life ==
The Kannywood actress married Alhaji Buba Abubakar on 25 February 2022 after controversy on the wedding date came up. A different date was used in the invitation to distract her fans

== Nomination and award ==
Aisha Tsamiya won Best Actress at the City People Awards in 2014.
