= Lilin Baba =

Nigerian singer and actor

- Born: Shu’aibu Ahmed Abbas; 1 January 1992 (age 34); Gwoza, Borno State, Nigeria
- Occupations: Singer, song writer, film actor, entrepreneur
- Years active: 2016–present
- Known for: His appearance in Hauwa Kulu
- Spouse: Ummi Rahab
- Parent(s): Ahmed Abbas (father), Binta Ahmed (mother)
- Awards: 2019 City People Entertainment, awards

Shu’aibu Ahmed Abbas (born 1 January 1992), known professionally as Lilin Baba, is a Nigerian singer, songwriter, record executive, film actor and entrepreneur. Lilin Baba is best known in Kannywood film industry for the role he played in his debut movie titled Hauwa Kulu. He was nominated at City People Entertainment Awards for 2018 Arewa Most Promising Music Act of the Year. He won the 2019 Arewa Best RnB Music Act of the Year at the City People Entertainment Awards.

== Early career ==
Lilin Baba used to sell ice blocks at ‘Bata,’ a local market in Fagge Local Government in Kano. After moving to Abuja with his brother, he set up his car and mortgage business.

== Music artist ==
After setting up his business, he met two producers, ‘Shadow’ and ‘Garkuwa.’ With their help, he released his debut song, " Arewa." He has released songs with Bala Usher and Mr. Cash. He has worked with Mr. Bangis, Adam A. Zango, Don Adah, Bash Em, Lilin Baba went to Lagos make songs with the biggest producers in the music industry and he work with the biggest music producer Blaisebeatz (Obah) and he released a single music called (Rabin Raina)and others are on the way.

=== Discography ===
- Rabin Raina Single (2022)produce by blaisebeatz (Obah)
- Tauraro EP 2022
- Sound from the north (2021) Album
- Arewa (2016)
- Dabbing (2019)
- Ba Zama (2019)
- Tsaya (2019)
- Mata (2022)
- Malawu (2025)

== Awards and nominations ==
Year	Award	Category	Result
2019	City People Entertainment Awards	Arewa Best RnB Music Act of the Year	Won
2018	City People Entertainment Awards	Arewa Most Promising Music Act of the Year	Nominated
2022	Peace Achievers International Awards		Nominated

== Personal life ==
On June 18, 2022, the actor married a Kannywood actress, Ummi Rahab.
