= Saratu Gidado =

Nigerian actress (1968–2024)

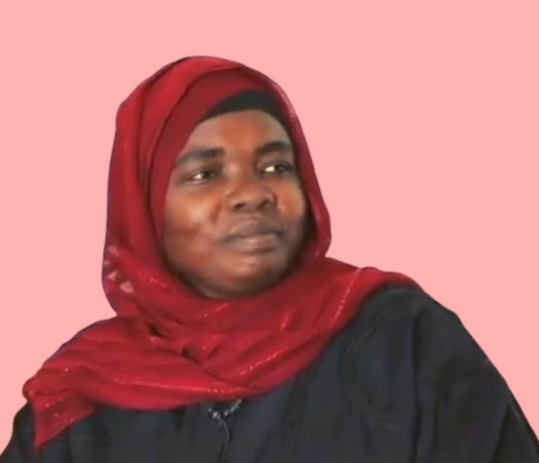
- Gidado in 2023
- Born: Saratu Mohammed Gidado; 17 January 1968; Chiranchi, Gwale, Kano State, Nigeria
- Died: 9 April 2024 (aged 56); Kano State, Nigeria
- Occupation: Actress
- Years active: 2000–2024
- Known for: Linzami Da Wuta
- Spouse: Muhammad Lawan

Saratu Gidado (17 January 1968 – 9 April 2024), popularly known as Daso, was a Nigerian film actress, primarily in the Kannywood film industry. She was known for the role she always played as an aggressive and mischievous actress who defied all odds to rise to stardom. She made her film debut in 2000 in Linzami Da Wuta, produced by Sarauniya Movies. Other hits such as Nagari, Gidauniya, Mashi, and Sansani followed. She affirmed that she liked playing the role of a wicked woman.

== Early life and career ==
Saratu Gidado was born in Gombe State northern Nigeria. She attended her primary school in Kano state. She was the first married woman in the Kannywood industry.

Aside from acting, Gidado was assigned as the protocol officer (Jakadiya) to the emir of Kano State Muhammadu Sanusi II in the year 2016.

== Death ==
Gidado died on 9 April 2024. She had the Ramadan Suhur before going to bed and died in her sleep, at the age of 56. She was buried according to Islamic teachings.

== Filmography ==
Saratu Gidado joined the Kannywood film industry in 2000 and has appeared in over 100 movies.

Title	Year	Role
Yar Mai Ganye		
Cudanya		
Nagari		
Sansani		
Mashi		
Fil'azal	2005	Hadiza
Gidauniya		
Gidan Iko		
Jakar Magori		
Mazan Baci		
Mazan Fama		
Rintsin Kauna		
Shelah		
Uwar Kudi		
Yammaci		
Daham	2005	
Sammeha	2012	
Gani Gaka	2013	
Ibro Ba Sulhu	2014	
There's a Way	2016	
Ba Tabbas	2017	
Sakace	2005	
Bakar tukunya	2007	
Takunsaka	2007	
Sabon shafi	2008	Baba Uwani
Sammatsi	2008	
Yayan baiwa	2008	
Gabas	2008	
Mu rike amana	2008	
Oga Abuja	2013	
Gani Ga Wane	2013	Haj. Rabi
Kawayen Amarya	2018	Haj. Bara
Karki Manta Dani	2019	Mama Jummai
Akeelah	2019	Umma
Fanan	2021	Mama
Alaqoa	2021	Haj Suwaiba
Lamba	2022	

== See also ==
- List of Kannywood actors
- IMDb
