= Nuhu Abdullahi =

Nigerian actor

- Born: Nuhu Abdullahi Balarabe; 3 January 1991 (age 35); Kano, Nigeria
- Citizenship: Nigerian
- Occupations: Actor, film producer and politician
- Years active: 2009–present
- Known for: His appearance in Kanin Miji
- Awards: City People Entertainment Awards Best Supporting actor

Nuhu Abdullahi Balarabe (born 3 January 1991) is a Nigerian film actor, producer and politician born and raised in Kano State. He is a Kannywood actors, who acts in both Hausa and English movies. He has won the best supporting actor in Kannywood at the City People Entertainment Awards in 2015.

== Career ==
Nuhu Abdullahi joined Kannywood film industry in 2009 as a film producer and has produced numbers of movies including Baya da Kura, Mafarin Tafiya, Ana Wata ga Wata, Ta leko ta koma, Mugun Zama, Rana Tara, Fulanin Asali, Kuskurena, Mujarrabi, and many more. Nuhu made his first movie appearance in a movie titled Ashabul Kahfi, he gained fame after his acting in one of the blockbuster movies call Kanin Miji.

In his response during the interview, Nuhu Abdullahi said..."

What were you doing before you started acting?

I was a film producer. I joined the Kannywood industry as a film producer in 2009 and I have produced films like Fulanin Asali, Kuskure, Mujarrabi and others.

— Daily Trust, Nuhu Abdullahi: 'I never knew my work would go international', 2 June 2018

== Filmography ==
Title	Year
Haseena	ND
Hajjaju	ND
Ta Leko Ta Koma	ND
Yanmata	ND
Tsammani	ND
Wata Mafita	ND
Thorny	ND
Heart Beat	ND
Yello Pape	ND
Light and Darkness	ND
Fulanin Asali	2010
Kuskure Na	2011
Mujarrabi	2011
Idan Haka Ne	2012
Gaba Da Gabanta	2013
Ashabu Kahfi	2014
Kanin Miji	2014
Baya Da Kura	2014
Ana Wata	2015
Ba’asi	2015
Gamu Nan Dai	2015
Ana Wata Ga Wata	2015
Dattijo	2016
Mafarin Tafiya	2016
Jarumta	2016
There's A Way	2016
Wata Mafita	2018
Mugun Zama	2018
Rana Tara	2018
Ta Leko Ta Koma	2018
Aisha	2018

== See also ==
- List of Nigerian actors
- List of Nigerian film producers
- List of Kannywood actors
