= Rashida Adamu Abdullah =

Nigerian actress

Rashida Adamu Abdullah popularly known as Rashida Maisa'a is a Nigerian film actress, film maker and politician, born and raised in Tarauni, Kano state, in northwestern Nigeria. Rashida is well known in kannywood film industry and her first film was Jariya but she made her debut in the film "Sa'a" which she produced and also earned her the title of "Maisa'a".

== Filmography ==
- Tutar so
- Halwa
- Gobe-Da-Nisa

== See also ==
- List of Nigerian actors
- List of Nigerian film producers
- List of Kannywood actors
