= Falalu A Dorayi =

Nigerian film director and producer

- Born: Falalu Abubakar Dorayi; 4 January 1977 (age 49); Gwale, Kano State, Nigeria
- Education: Maitama Sule University, Kano
- Occupations: Director; producer; screenwriter; film actor
- Years active: 1997–present
- Known for: Best known as the director of Basaja

Falalu Abubakar Dorayi also known as Falalu A. Dorayi (born 4 January 1977) is a Nigerian film director, producer, screenwriter and film actor.

== Early life and background ==
Dorayi was born on 4 January 1977 at Dorayi, Gwale, Kano State to Alhaji Abubakar a businessman in Kano. He attended both primary and secondary school in Kano. He obtained a diploma in Mass Communication from Bayero University Kano and acquired a professional diploma in Film & Television Production at Maitama Sule University, Kano in 2017. Dorayi also attended film training program at the Asian Academy of Film & Television, Noida in India.

== Career ==
Dorayi began his career in film industry in 1997, with a local drama group when he was in secondary school. After completing his high school studies Dorayi joined Kannywood film industry, the first two film he directed were taken up and claimed by the producer of the film who gave himself the credit of director. He received another directorial opportunities with Sarauniya Films in which he directed film called Kwangiri, then followed by Uwargida and Majalisa.

Dorayi rose to prominence after directing Basaja (2013), in which he featured ensemble cast including Ali Nuhu, Adam A Zango, and Hadiza Aliyu. The film was a huge success and was nominated at the 2014 City People Entertainment Awards. In 2015, Dorayi produced Gwaska (directed by Adam A Zango), and later Return of Gwaska in 2017.

In 2019, Dorayi directed and starred a TV show named Gidan Badamasi, a comedy which centers around the controversial "Badamasi Family." The drama revolves around Bamasi’s family that gang up against him when he fails to fulfill his promises.

He received the "Best Actor Kannywood Industry" award for the movie Kwana Casa'in..

== Filmography ==
List of films directed by Dorayi.

Title	Year
Allo	ND
Farar Saka	ND
Fataken Dare	ND
Fitilar Dare	ND
Ibro Dan Fulani	ND
Larai	ND
Madugu	ND
Mukaddari	ND
Namamajo	ND
Ragas	ND
Sa’a Dai	ND
Sowa	ND
Tarkon Kauna	ND
Tsartuwa	ND
Yau A Gari	ND
Zatona	ND
Zo Mu Zauna	ND
Bana Bakwai	2007
Artabu	2009
Ahlul Kitab	2011
Sandar Kiwo	2011
Sayyada	2011
Zarar Bunu	2011
Andamali	2013
Mai Dalilin Aure (Match Maker)	2014
Soyayya Da Shakuwa	2014
There’s a Way	2016
Gwaska	2017
Juyin Sarauta	2017
Alkibla	2018
Hanyar Kano	2014
Gidan Badamasi	

== See also ==
- List of Nigerian actors
- List of Nigerian film directors
- List of Nigerian film producers
