= Diamond Zahra =

Nigerien actress

- Born: Zahra Muhammad; March 25, 1996 (age 30); Niger Republic
- Education: Maradi
- Occupations: Actress, film maker
- Years active: 2018–present
- Notable credit: Best known for her appearance in Zuma Da Madaci

Zahra Muhammad also known as Diamond Zahra or Zahra Buzuwa is a Nigerien professional actress. Zahra was born in Tahoua but attended her primary and secondary education in Maradi all in the Republic of Niger. She is from the Tuareg ethnic group.

== Early life and career ==
Zahra relocated to Nigeria to join the Kannywood Hausa movie industry in 2018. The movie that brought the actress prominence was the film "Zuma Da Madaci (2018). Zarah has since starred in various Hausa movies such as Hanan, Barrister Kabeer, Gidan Sirikai, Sirrin So (Series), Yaudara, among others. She has also appeared in numerous Hausa songs with Hausa musicians such as; Hamisu Breaker, Garzali Miko, Umar M Shariff and others.
