= Malam Nata'ala =

Nigerian actor and film producer

- Born: Mato Yakubu; 15 August 1967 (age 58); Potiskum, Yobe State, Nigeria
- Occupations: Producer; actor; comedian
- Years active: 1981 - 2025
- Children: 10

Alhaji Mato Yakubu (Mato na Mato or Mahaluki) (August 15, 1967 - November 2, 2025) popularly known as Malam Nata'ala mai Sittin Goma for his role in the Arewa24 TV series, Daɗin Kowa was a Nigerian comedian, producer, musician and veteran actor in Kannywood, the Hausa film cinema industry in Northern Nigeria.

== Personal life ==
Yakubu was born in Dambuwa Rijiya, in Potiskum, Potiskum Local Government Area of Yobe State, Nigeria. He attended Almajiri School for Islamic education in Zango, and Jimeta, in Adamawa State where he met with the former Yobe State Governor, Sen. Mamman Bello Ali. He founded the acclaimed first music recording studio in Potiskum, the Mahaluki Musical Studio.

== Filmography ==
Title	Type	Role
Dadin Kowa	Television series	Malam Nata’ala
Karshen Munafiki jin Kunya	Film	Actor
Katanga	Film	Actor
Ibro Usama	Film	Actor
Ibro Dan Kwanakwana	Film	Producer
Aljanar Ibro	Film	Producer

== Death ==
Yakubu died in a hospital in Maiduguri after a prolonged illness on 2 November 2025. In his interview with BBC Hausa, Yakubu explained he was married to 3 wives and had 10 children.
