= Maryam Yahaya =

Nigerian actress

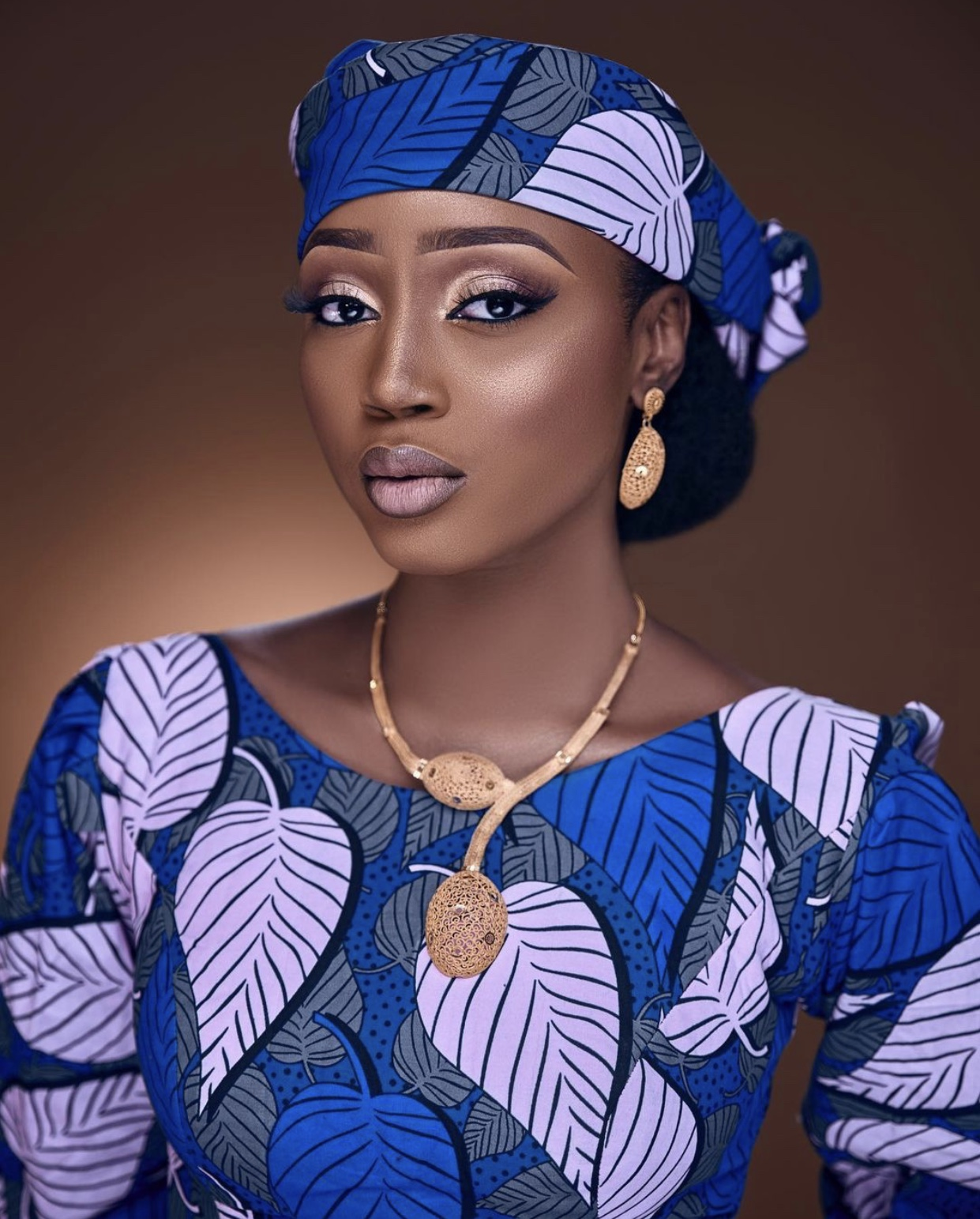
- Born: 17 July 1997 (age 28); Kano, Nigeria
- Occupation: Film actress
- Years active: 2016–present
- Known for: Mansoor
- Notable work: Actress

Maryam Yahaya is a Nigerian film actress in the Kannywood industry. She gained recognition for starring in Taraddadi, a movie directed by Elnass Ajenda. For her role, Yahaya was nominated as best promising actress by City People Entertainment Awards in 2017. She was also nominated as best actress by City People Entertainment Awards in 2018.

== Career ==
Yahaya wanted to act from her childhood and was inspired by the Hausa movies she watched. She made her debut in the film Gidan Abinci, followed by Barauniya and Tabo, in which she played minor roles. She gained fame after adapting a leading role originally meant for Bilkisu Shema in Mansoor, a sensation movie directed by Ali Nuhu.

== Filmography ==
Films in which Yahaya has appeared
Title	Year	Role
Gidan Abinci	2016	
Barauniya	2016	
Tabo	2017	
Mijin Yarinya	2017	
Mansoor	2017	Maryam
Mariya	2018	Mariya
Jummai Ko Larai	2018	
Matan Zamani	2018	
Hafiz	2018	
Gidan Kashe Awo	2018	
Gurguwa	2018	
Mujadala	2018	
Wutar Kara	2019	
Sareenah	2019	
Jaruma	2020	
Gidan Kashe Ahu	2020	
Tsakaninmu	2021	Nafisa
Alaqa	2021	Ummi
Hikima	2021	
Lamba	2022	
Sarki Goma Zamani Goma	2021	
sakaninmu	2021	Nafisa
Zan Rayu Dake	2019	

== See also ==
- List of Nigerian actors
- List of Kannywood actors
