= Abubakar Bashir Maishadda =

Nigerian film producer

- Born: Abubakar Bashir Abdulkarim; 2 August 1988 (age 37); Kano, Nigeria
- Education: Northwest University
- Occupations: Producer; Distributor; Chairman of Maishadda Global Resource Ltd
- Years active: 2012 - present
- Parent(s): Bashir Abdulkarim (father), Safiya Sani Na'ibi (mother)
- Awards: See below

Abubakar Bashir Abdulkarim, also known as Abubakar Bashir Maishadda (born 2 August 1988), is a Nigerian film producer who works in the Kannywood film industry. He is the founder of Maishadda Global Resources LTD. He has produced a number of films under his banner, featuring Kannywood stars such as Ali Nuhu, Sadiq Sani Sadiq, Maryam Yahaya, Yakubu Muhammed, and Rahama Sadau, in films like Takanas Ta Kano (2014), Daga Murna (2015), Wutar Kara (2019), Hafeez (2019), Mujadala (2019), Mariya (2019), Ana Dara Ga Dare (2018) and Hauwa Kulu (2019). Maishadda is frequently considered "king of the box office". He received City People Entertainment Awards in 2018 and 2019, and 2015 Africa Magic Viewers Choice Awards in the best indigenous language category (Hausa).

== Early life and background ==
Abubakar Bashir Maishadda was born on 2 August 1988 in Dandishe, Dala local government of Kano State. He grew up in Gadon Kaya, Gwale local government of Kano State. He is the son of Alhaji Bashir Abdulkarim Maishadda and Safiya Sani Na'ibi.

Maishadda attended Shukura International Nursery and Primary School Kurna for his nursery school and later moved to Gadon Kaya where he continued his primary school at ACE Academy. He completed his primary and secondary school education from Sheik Bashir El-rayyah School Complex. He obtained a National Diploma in Computer Science and another in Filmmaking from Northwest University.

== Career ==
Maishadda joined the Kannywood film industry in 2012 with the help of Abubakar A.S Mai Kwai. He later met Ibrahim Bala, who is also a film director in the Kannywood film industry. They worked together and produced a film titled Ba Girma (2014), which was his first film.

Maishadda has produced more than 50 films both in Hausa and English. He has collaborated with Kabiru Jammaje to produce English films such as Light and Darkness (2016), In Search of the King (2018), and This is the Way (2018).

2019 marked a turning point for Maishadda after releasing Hauwa Kulu (War against rape) (2019), in which he addressed the issue of rape. Hauwa Kulu won best movie of the year at the 2019 City People Entertainment Awards.

In 2020, Maishadda collaborated with Ali Nuhu and Kabiru Jammaje to produce the highest budgeted film The Right Choice (2020), which featured top Nollywood stars.

== Awards ==
Year	Award	Category	Film	Result
2015	2015 Africa Magic Viewers Choice Awards	Best Producer	Binkice	Won
2016	Africa Magic Viewers Choice Awards	Best Film	Sakaina	Nominated
2017	City People Entertainment Awards	Best Producer		Nominated
2018	City People Entertainment Awards	Best Producer		Won
2019	Zuma Festival Awards	Best Producer	Mariya	Won
2019	City People Entertainment Awards	Best Producer	Hauwa Kulu	Won
2019	City People Entertainment Awards	Best Film	Hauwa Kulu	Won
2020	Africa Magic Viewers Choice Awards	Best Film	Mariya	Nominated

== Producer filmography ==
Title	Year	Role
Binkice	2014	producer
Budurwa	2014	producer
Tarayya	2014	producer
Bakar Inuwa	2014	producer
Sakaina	2014	producer
Farin Gani	2014	producer
Zee Zee	2014	producer
Hakkin Miji	2014	producer
Munubiya	2014	producer
Da’ira	2014	producer
Kafin Safiya	2014	producer
Gobarar Mata	2014	producer
Takanas Ta Kano	2015	producer
Dan Gaske	2015	producer
Mafiya	2015	producer
Daga Murna Anga Jaka	2015	producer
Kishiya Da Kishiya	2015	producer
Gidan Abinci	2016	producer
Kowa Darling	2016	executive producer
Karfen Nasara	2016	producer
Tsakar Gidan Jatau	2016	producer
Kwamandan Mata	2016	producer
Kauyawa	2016	producer
Mijin Aro	2016	producer
Biki Buduri	2016	producer
Kanwar Dubarudu	2016	producer
Ruwa A Jallo	2016	producer
Burin Fatima	2016	producer
Mubeena	2016	producer
Bashi Hanji	2016	producer
Dije Rama	2016	producer
Kalan Dangi	2016	producer
Mariya	2018	producer
Mujadala	2018	producer
This is the Way	2018	producer
In Search for The King	2018	producer
Ana Dara Ga Dare	2018	producer
Sarkakiya	2018	producer
Hafeez	2019	producer
Sareena	2019	producer
Halimatus Sadiya	2019	producer
Nadiya	2019	producer
Wutar Kara	2019	producer
Hauwa Kulu	2019	producer
Bana Bakwai	2019	producer
Ciwon Idanu Na	2019	producer
So Da So	2019	producer
Ana Barin Halak	2019	producer
Karki Manta Dani	2019	Associate producer
Ana Dara Ga Dare	2019	producer
The Right Choice	2020	producer
Bintu	2020	producer
Sarki Goma Zamani Goma	2021	Executive producer

== See also ==
IMDb

== Personal life ==
On June 18, 2022, Maishadda married a Kannywood actress known as Hassana Muhammad.
