= Adam Garba =

Nigerian actor

Adam Garba is a Nigerian actor. He has appeared in Hausa and English films and is often regarded as "Raba Gardama" for his breakout role in the Arewa24 TV series "Labarina". He has starred in Nollywood films including Voiceless, To Adaego with Love and The Herd.

Garba, alongside actor Amina Uba Hassan, was suspended from appearing in any films in Kano State (Kannywood) for a year from May 2026.

== Filmography ==
=== Films ===
- Voiceless
- To Adaego with Love
- The Herd
- The Plan
- In Another Life
- Love Language
- Balaraba
- Hijack '93
- A Lot Like Love (2023)

=== Series ===
- Labarina
- Wata Shida
