= Jamila Nagudu =

Nigerian Kannywood actress (born 1985)

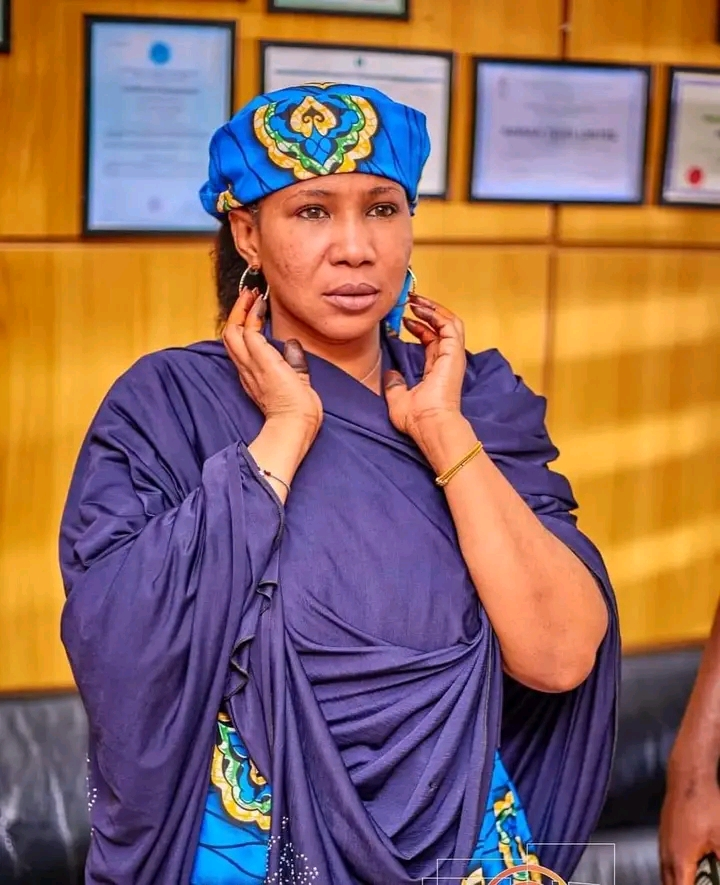
- Born: Jamila Umar Nagudu; 8 October 1985 (age 40); Toro, Bauchi State
- Citizenship: Nigerian
- Occupation: Actress
- Years active: 2002-present
- Children: 1

Jamila Umar Nagudu (born 10 August 1985) is a Nigerian actress working in Kannywood.

== Early life and education ==
Nagudu was born on 10 August 1985 in Magama Gumau, in Magama gumau, Toro Local Government Area of Bauchi State, Nigeria. She attended primary and secondary schools in Bauchi State.

== Career ==
Jamila Umar, better known as Jamila Umar Nagudu, made her film debut in the Kannywood industry in 2002, first as a dancer and later as an actress. She has appeared in both romantic movies and comedy films. She is often referred to as the "Queen of Kannywood". Director Aminu Saira was the first to cast her in the film "Jamila da Jamilu" as an actress. She was nominated for best of Nollywood in Abeokuta.

== Ambassador ==
Nagudu has an endorsement with companies like Ajinomoto and Globacom.

== Personal life ==
Nagudu is divorced and has a son.

== Filmography ==
Films
Some of her movies include
- Hindu (2015)
- Subulli da subulluwa
- Jani jani
- Aska Tara
- Haske
- wani gari
- Halisa
- Mai dalilin aure
- Farin dare (2013)
- Jarumta
- Ali yaga Ali
- Karshen tika tiki (2020)
- Jamila da jamilu
- Buka
- Kauyawa
- Buka Africana
- Maula
- Almajiri
- Gidan kisto
- Mijin biza
- Manyan Mata Series
- Garwashi Series
- Budurwar Mijina Series
- Hakima (2021)
- Mati a Zazzau (2020)
- Karamin sani (2020)
- Tsalle Daya (2019)
- Manyan Gobe (2019)
- Hafeez (2019)
- Kawayen Amarya (2018)
- Ruwan Dare (2018)
- Mariya (2018)
- Kalan Dangi (2017)
- Husna Ko Husna? (2017)
- Mijin Biza (2017)
- Kowa Dalin (2016)
- Mai Nasibi (2016)
- Akasi (2016)
- Na Hauwa (2015)
- Uwar Mugu (2014)
- Wani Gari (2013)
- Hausa fulani (2006)
- Taken lamba (2006)

See also IMDb

== Awards ==
Year	Award	Category	Result
2015	Best Actress(Kannywood)	City People Entertainment Awards	Won
2016	Best Actress(Kannywood)	City People Entertainment Awards	Won
2017	Best Actress(Kannywood)	City People Movie Awards	Won
2016	Face of Kannywood	City People Movie Awards	Won
2017	Face of Kannywood	City People Movie Awards	Won
