= Rukayya Dawayya =

Kannywood actress

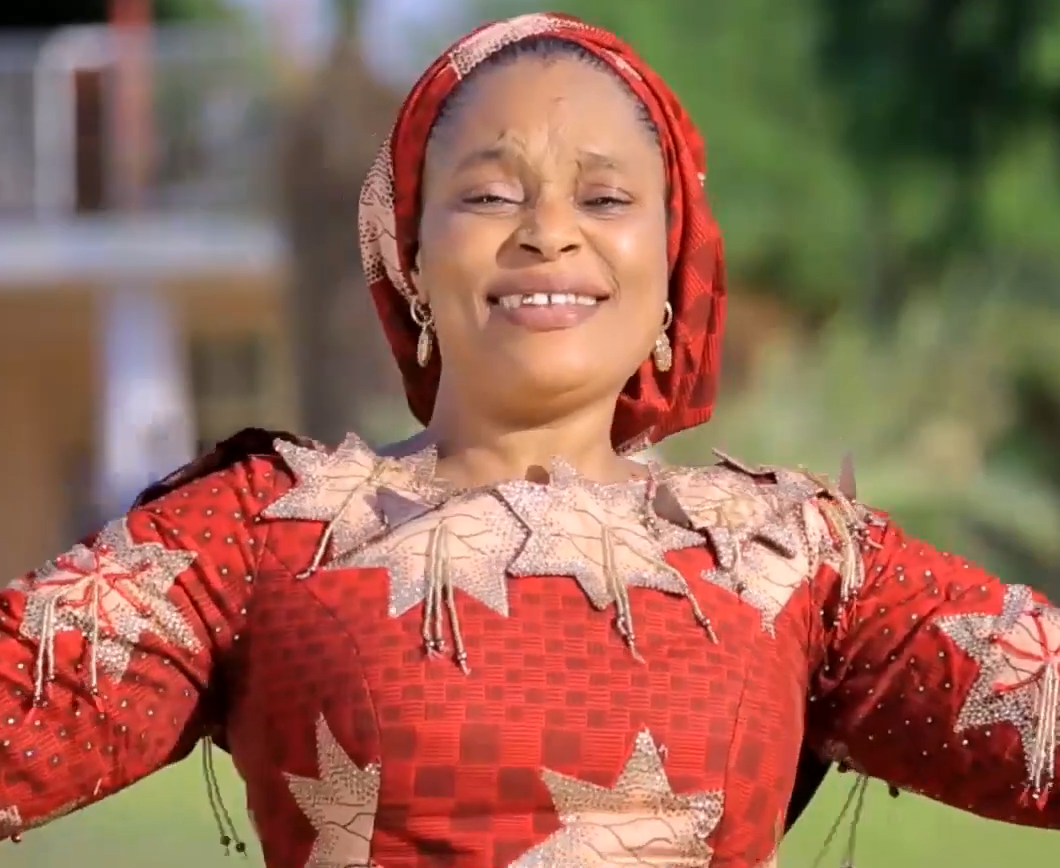
- Born: Rukayya Umar Santa; October 17, 1985 (age 40); Kano State
- Other name: Dawayya
- Citizenship: Nigerian
- Education: Bayero University Kano
- Occupations: Actress, Business Woman
- Years active: 2000-present
- Children: 1

Rukayya Umar Dawaiya (born 17 October 1985) is a Nigerian Kannywood actress from Kano State Nigeria.

== Early life and education ==
Rukayya Umar Dawayya was born on 17 October 1985 in Kano. Her father is a business man from Matazu, Katsina State while her mother is from Borno State. Dawayya did her Primary and Secondary schools in Kano where she obtained a certificate in Arabic language in Saudi Arabia. Dawayya also obtained the National Diploma in Mass Communication from Bayero University Kano.

== Career ==
Rukayya Umar Dawaiya made her film debut in 2000 in her debut film "Dawayya" which earned her the title of Dawayya. According to her website, she has made a name for herself in the film Dawayya which has inspired her to continue making films. Dawayya has made over 150 films in the Hausa Film industry. Dawayya is an ambassador to some companies inside and outside Nigeria. She is also a politician and business woman.

== Personal life ==
Dawayya got married in 2012 and got divorced in 2014. She has a son who was born in Mecca, Saudi Arabia.

== Filmography ==
- Ummi Sambo
- Rudani
- Alkibla
- Angon hajiya
- Igama
- Hamdala
- Jarumai
- Khusufi.
