= Nura M Inuwa =

Nigerian musical artist

- Also known as: M Inuwa
- Born: Nura Musa Inuwa; 18 September 1989 (age 36); Dala, Kano State, Nigeria
- Genres: Afrobeats; R&B; hip hop; reggae; Afropop
- Occupations: Singer; songwriter; record producer; entrepreneur; film producer
- Instruments: Vocals; vocal percussion
- Years active: 2010–present
- Label: M INUWA EDUTAINMENT
- Spouse: Amina Wada (m. 2017)

Nura Musa Inuwa also called M Inuwa (born 18 September 1989) is a Nigerian singer, songwriter and musician of Hausa. also an artist and film producer. He was born, raised and educated in Kano State in the town of Gwammaja in Dala Local Government Area, Kano.

== Career ==
Most of his songs were used in Kannywood films. He has over 500 songs. He associates with Umar Sharif, together they released an album called Rarrashi. A Kannywood actor Adam A Zango was also his close friend in Kannywood film industry. He portrayed Nura M inuwa in a film called Rigar Aro. In 2019 he sang a campaign song to opposition candidate Alhaji Atiku Abubakar, the former Vice President of the Federal Republic of Nigeria. In the year 2012 battery acid was poured on his face. An unknown person called him to go and meet him in sharada, he told him he wanted him to sing him a song for his wedding, his bride asked him to give Nura M inuwa the contract of their wedding song, when he arrived, they poured him acid on his face, which led to the destruction of his left eye, the criminals were unknown.

== Discography ==
Aisha Humaira, Rai-dai, Badi ba rai, Soyayyar Facebook, Sayyada, Mijin Biza, Abinda Yake Ruhi, Alkuki, Yan Kudu, Zurfin Ciki, Soyayyace, Faggen Soyayya, inka iya zance, Ga wuri ga waina, Ummi, Babban gida, Dan gwamna, Manyanmata, Hubbi, Matan Zamani, Ɗan Baiwa, Basaja, Zurfin Ciki, Abbana, Alkawari, Dawo dawo, Wata Ruga, Yar Fulani, Salma, Mai Gadan Zinare, Labarina, Yan Arewa, Duniyar Masoya, Mailaya, In Kaiya Zance, Daren Alkhairi.

== Albums ==
s/n	Album	Year
1	Wasika	2018
2	Dan magori	2018
3	Makashinka	2012
4	Afra	2015
5	Siyan baki	2018
6	Matan gida	2018
7	Soyayya	2016
8	Ranar aurena	2018
9	Maurata.	
10	Manyan mata	2018
11	Soyayya	2015
12	Rigar aro	2015

== See also ==
- List of Hausa people
