= Mansur Makeup =

Nigerian make-up artist, film producer and actor (born 1994)

- Born: Mansur Ismail; 15 January 1994 (age 32); Kabala, Kaduna State, Nigeria
- Citizenship: Nigerian
- Education: University of Jos
- Occupations: Makeup artist, Actor and Film Maker
- Years active: 2007 present
- Known for: Makeup
- Awards: KDC Awards, Best makeup artist

Mansur Ismail (born 15 January 1994; popularly known as Mansur Makeup) is a Nigerian make-up artist, film producer and film actor from Northern Nigeria's movie industry, known as Kannywood.

== Early life and education ==
Mansur was born in the Kabalan Doki, Kaduna City on 15 January 1994. He attended both primary and secondary schools in Kaduna, and he studied Art at University of Jos, Plateau State.

== Career ==
Mansur started his makeup artistry in 2007 upon the advice of his friend, who is also a filmmaker, to join the Kannywood industry. Mansur then got involved in Makeup and worked in the Makeup department in some of the biggest films of the Kannywood industry.

Mansur said

I have been a make-up artist all my life, and I train myself to be good since then. Although makeup is what I know best, I will also want to start producing films next year.

— Premium Times Nigeria, Mansur "Makeup" adds film production to his 2016 wish-list | Premium Times Nigeria, 26 December 2015
