= Halima Atete =

Nigerian actress

- Born: Halima Yusuf Atete; 26 November 1988 (age 37); Maiduguri, Borno State, Nigeria
- Occupations: Actress, Film Producer
- Years active: 2012 - Present
- Known for: Her appearance in Dakin Amarya
- Awards: best new actress at the City People Entertainment Awards in 2013

Halima Yusuf Atete also known as Halima Atete (born 26 November 1988) is a Nigerian film actress and film producer, born and raised in Maiduguri, Borno state. Halima Atete is well known in kannywood film industry for the role she always plays as the mischievous and jealousy-filled role. She joined kannywood in 2012 and made her debut in Asalina, (My Origin) a film that she produced. After her appearance in several movies such as Kona Gari, Asalina, Dakin Amarya, she won best new actress at the City People Entertainment Awards in 2013. She was nominated by the London based news organization African Voice over her excellent performance in the entertainment industry.

== Early life and career ==
Halima Atete was born in Maiduguri, Borno state. She attended Maigari primary school and graduated from Yerwa government day secondary school. Halima obtained National Diploma in sharia and civil law. Halima Atete joined kannywood film industry in 2012 and appeared in over 160 movies. She has also produced a number of movies such as Asalina (My Origin), and Uwar Gulma (Mother of Gossip). She was of the opinion that she would never sleep with a producer to get a role. She got married in 2023 and the event was attended by many kannywood actors

== Awards ==
Year	Award	Category	Result
2013	City People Entertainment Awards	Best New Actress	Won
2014	City People Entertainment Awards	Best Supporting Actress	Won
2017	African Voice	Best Actress	Nominated
2017	City People Entertainment Awards	Best Actress	Won
2018	City People Entertainment Awards	Kannywood Face	Won

== Filmography ==
Title	Year	Role
Wata Hudu	ND	
Yaudarar Zuciya	ND	
Asalina (My Origin)	2012	
Kona Gari	2012	
Dakin Amarya	2013	
Matar Jami’a	2013	
Wata Rayuwa	2013	
Ashabu Kahfi	2014	
Ba’asi	2014	
Bikin Yar Gata	2014	
Maidalilin Aure	2014	
Soyayya Da Shakuwa	2014	
Alkalin Kauye	2015	
Bani Bake	2015	
Kurman Kallo	2015	
Uwar Gulma (Mother of Gossip)	2015	
Mu’amalat	2016	
Igiyar Zato	2016	
Alkibla	2017	Iklima
Ladan Noma	2018	Delu
Fuska Biyu	2018	Tabawa
Kawayen Amarya	2018	Mabaruka
Matar Mutum	2019	
Karshen tika tiki	2020	Anna

== See also ==
- List of Nigerian actors
- List of Nigerian film producers
- List of Kannywood actors
