= Dede One Day =

Nigerian comedian and actor

- Born: Peter Onwuzurike Onyehidelam; Aba, Abia State
- Died: 14 December 2015
- Occupation: Standup Comedian . Actor

Dede One Day (born Peter Onwuzurike Onyehidelam; died 14 December 2015) was a Nigerian standup comedian and comic actor.

== Life ==
Dede One Day was a native of Umuagwuru Mbieri in Imo State but was born and raised in Aba, a town in Abia State, Nigeria. His career hit the spotlight upon the subsequent release of his Laugh With Me comedy series.

== Death ==
Dede One Day died in the early hours of 14 December 2015 after he slumped while performing at an event in Aba, following complications of hypertension.
