= Yakubu Mohammed =

Yakubu Mohammed may refer to:

- Yakubu Mohammed (footballer, born 1990), Nigerian football forward
- Yakubu Mohammed (footballer, born 1996), Nigerian football defender
- Yakubu Mohammed (politician), Ghanaian MP representing Ahafo Ano South East

== See also ==
- Yakubu Muhammed (born 1973), Nigerian film actor, producer, director, singer and scriptwriter
