= Darasimi Nadi =

Nigerian actor

- Born: September 27, 2011 (age 14); Ibadan ogun State, Nigeria
- Occupation: Actress
- Years active: present

Darasimi Destiny Nadi (born 2011) is a Nigerian child actor, model, and TV host who acts in the Nollywood movie industry.

Darasimi Nadi was born on September 27, 2011 in Ibadan, Oyo state She is from the Tiv tribe of Benue state. She currently attends Janet and John Secondary School in Lagos state, Nigeria.

Darasimi Nadi had her first acting debut in the film one night one chance. She later featured in several movies and skits, including Obara’M, A Father's Love, Aburo, Shining Star, Tokunbo, moji, Supa nowa, heartstring, a fathers love, shining star, and Dark heart. She is also a co-host on the Indomie Love Bowl Game Show alongside Stephanie Coker.

== Honors and awards ==
- Best Supporting Actress at 2025 Africa Magic Viewers’ Choice Awards (AMVCA)
- Best Young Actress – Nigerian Teens Choice Awards
- Most Promising Child Actor – Future Stars Awards
- Best child Actor BON award 2014
- Best child actor (Ibadan international film festival)
- Best Actor (all African Indie film festival AAIFF)
