= Onuora Abuah =

British-Nigerian actor

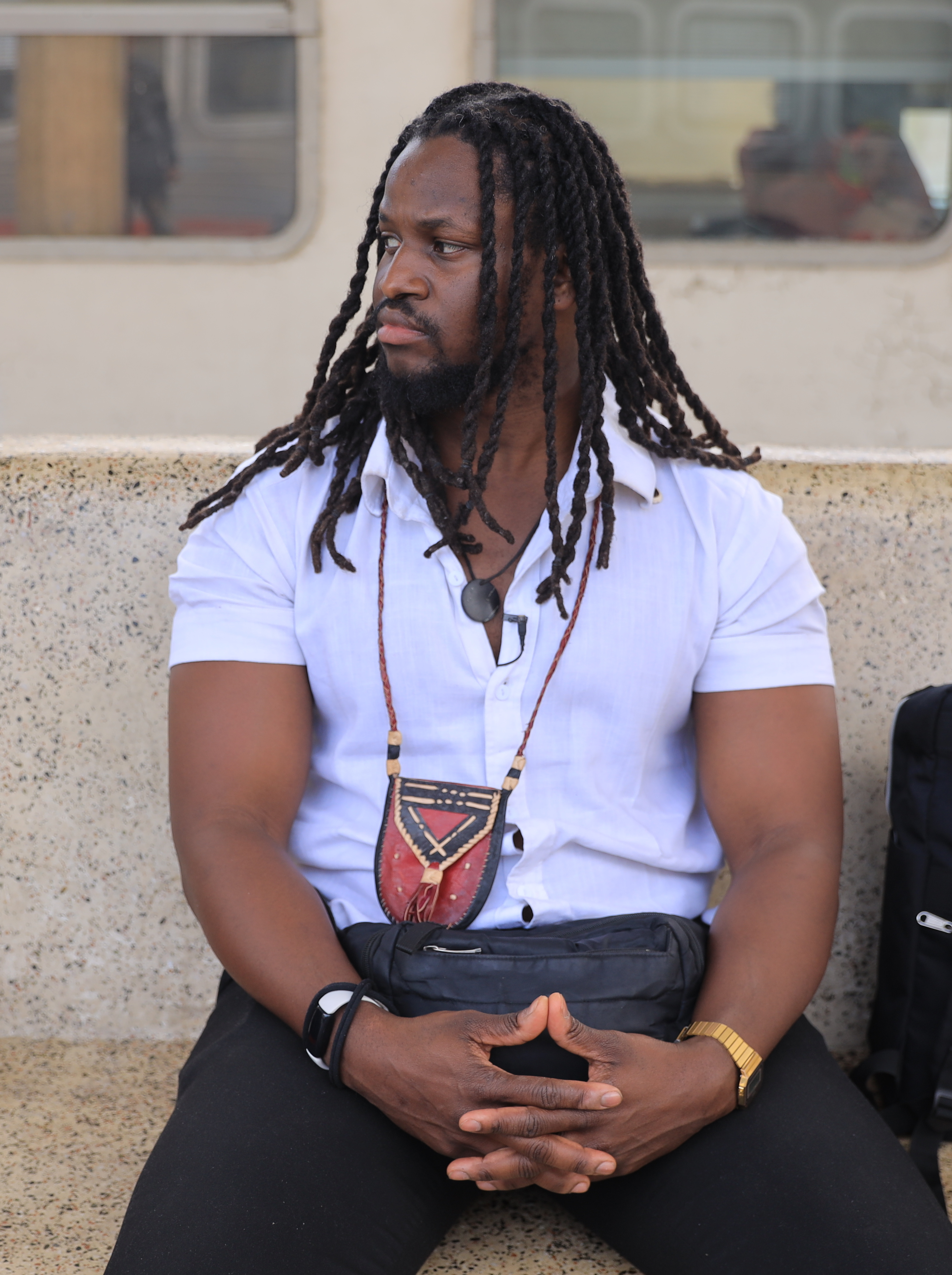
- Onuora Abuah in 2022
- Born: Anthony Onuora Ejoh-Abuah; Nairobi
- Other name: Anthony Abuah
- Education: Central Film School
- Occupations: actor, film director, producer, writer and author
- Years active: 2008–present
- Known for: Woolwich Boys, Danhomé & Vodun
- Notable work: Mona

Anthony Onuora Abuah is a Nigerian–British actor, film director, producer and writer.

== Early life and education ==
He was born in Kenya to a Nigerian-Igbo father and Rwandan/ Ugandan mother of the Tutsi ethnic group. He spent his childhood around central and west Africa before his family relocated to Switzerland in Europe in 1995. Onuora attended the British School of Lomé where he spends three productive years and was given the opportunity to hone his writing and acting skills, before moving to the United Kingdom to attend Plymouth University and he later obtained a master's degree in Filmmaking from Central Film School.

== Career ==
=== Acting ===
After living in Cardiff for a few years, Onuora joined the London-based MeWe Youth Theatre Company, where he was cast in a play about the ex-slave turned author, Olaudah Equiano. He later played the role of Olaudah Equiano in a short film from Talawa Theatre company for the Victoria & Albert Museum. His first feature film was in Tony Kaye's Black Water Transit (2009), before playing the lead role in the low budget film Patrolmen (2010). He then wrote and produced his first play Another Biafra, about the ongoing Niger-Delta oil crisis.

=== Directing ===
Onuora directed his first feature film Woolwich Boys (2012), which screened at the British Urban Film Festival and was licensed by London Live in the UK, ETV in South Africa and Ebonylife TV across Africa. His second film, Mona (2016) starring David Avery and Lonyo, won the Grand Nile Award at the 2016 Luxor African Film Festival and was also nominated for two Africa Movie Academy Awards.

=== Documentaries ===
Abuah has produced several documentaries on African history including Danhomé & Vodun (2018), A Thousand Years to Tomboctou (2019), Kano with Onuora Abuah (2020) and Revolution Now: 5 Days with Sowore (2022) about Sahara Reporters Founder Omoyele Sowore.

== Filmography ==
Year	Title	Role	Notes
2011	The Unlucky Mother	Director, producer, writer	Short Film
2012	Woolwich Boys	Actor, director, producer, writer	Crime Drama
2013	Trim	Executive Producer, director, writer	Web Series
2014	Woodfalls	Actor, producer	Drama
2014	Mum Dad Meet Sam	Producer	Romantic Comedy
2016	Mona	Actor, producer, director, writer	Political Thriller
2018	Danhomé & Vodun	Director, producer, writer	Documentary
2019	A Thousand Years to Tomboctou	Director, producer, writer	Documentary
2019	Kano with Onuora Abuah	Director, producer, writer	Documentary
2020	Tainted Canvas	Producer	Drama
2020	Headwrap	Producer, director, writer	Short Film
2020	Ouroboros	Actor	Short Film
2021	Ọjị	Producer, director, writer	Short Film
2021	Tafiya	Producer, director, writer	Short Film
2022	Revolution Now: 5 Days with Sowore	Director, producer, writer	Documentary
2023	km.t: A Journey through the Black Land	Actor, director, producer, writer	Documentary
2023	Deep Undercover: Part One	Actor	Pilot Film

== Awards and nominations ==
Year	Award ceremony	Category	Film	Result	Ref
2013	Africa Movie Academy Awards	Best Film by an African Abroad	Woolwich Boys	Nominated	
2016	Africa Movie Academy Awards	Best First Feature Film by a Director and Best Film by an African Living Abroad	Mona	Nominated	
2016	Luxor African Film Festival	Grand Nile Prize for Best Long Narrative	Mona	Won	
