= Aminu Baba Ari =

Nigerian Actor (born 1975)

Baba Ari
- Born: Aminu Baba Ali; September 21, 1975 (age 50); Kofar Nassarawa Kano State
- Education: Federal College of Education, Katsina
- Occupations: Actor, comedian, producer, script writer,
- Years active: 1998–present
- Known for: Comedy
- Title: Baba Ari

Aminu Baba Ali (born September 21, 1975) is a Nigerian actor and comedian. He acts in many Hausa movies and he is also known as Baba Ari.

== Early life and education ==
Baba Ari was born in Kofar Nassarawa of Kano. He was admitted to Federal College of Education, Katsina, to Study Fine Art

== Awards and nominations ==
Ari was nominated in MTN Kannywood award 2014 best comedian.

== Selected film ==
- Faida
- Yar Mai Ganye
- Akwatin Kudi
- Bakin Lago
- Dan China
- Ibro Dan Chacha
- Aljanna Dijama
- Hassan da Hussain
- Raina
- Jakar Magori
- Layar Bata
- Maguzawa
- Mai dokar Bacci
- Mazan Bachi
- Kawa Zuci
- Rai Na
- Ragon Shiri
- Sakarkaru
- Siyasar Daushe
- Tsohon Dan Siyasa

Year	Award	Category	Result
2014	MTN Kannywood Award	Best Comedian	Nominated
