= Aminu Kano College of Islamic Legal Studies =

Higher education institution in Kano, Nigeria

Aminu Kano College of Islamic Legal Studies (AKCILS).
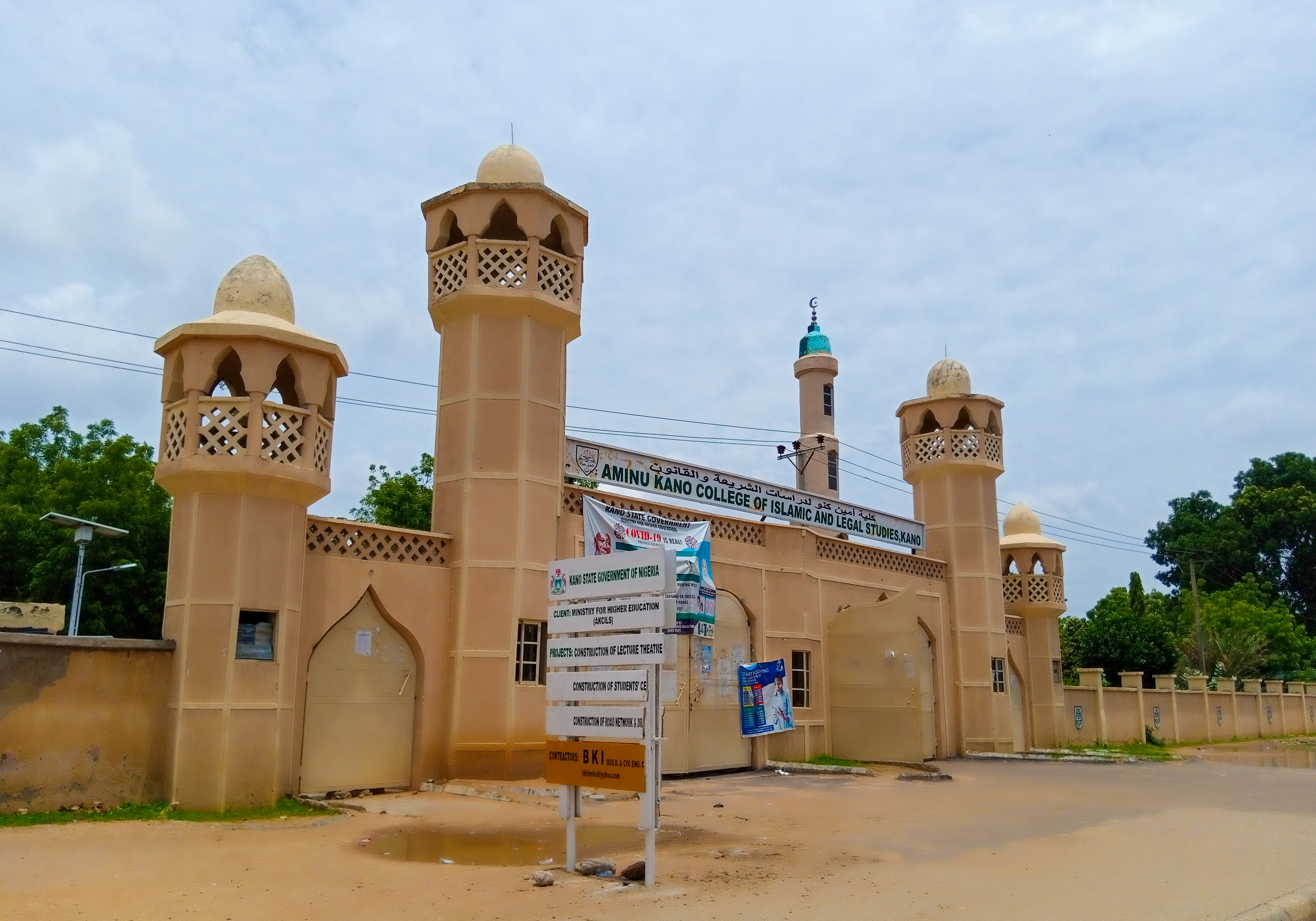
- Motto: "Knowledge is the Light of Life"
- Type: Public
- Established: 1976
- Provost: Balarabe A. Jakada
- Location: Kano State, Nigeria, Kano State, Nigeria
- Website: Official website

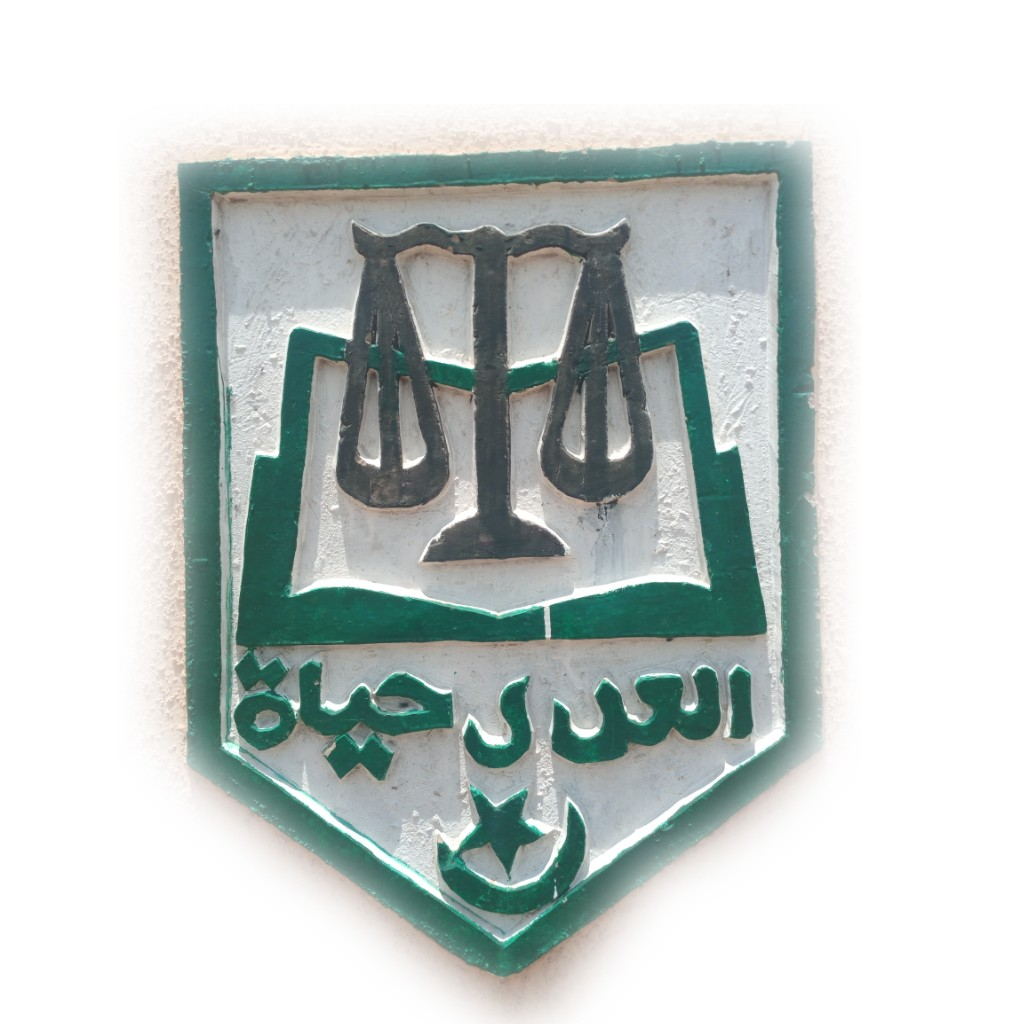

The Aminu Kano College of Islamic Legal Studies is a state government higher education institution located in Kano State, Nigeria. The current Provost is Balarabe A. Jakada.

== Establishment ==
The college was established in the year 1981 by Law No12 of 1981, now Chapter 32 laws of the state. The collection its now operated under the auspices of the then College of Arts and Science situated at its temporary site in the area.

== Courses ==
The institution offers the following courses;

- English
- Primary Education Studies
- Geography
- Arabic
- History
- Social Studies
- Hausa
- Physical And Health Education
- Early Childhood Care Education
- Special Education
- Islamic Studies
- Economics
- Political Science
- Computer Science
- Business Education
