= Ifeanyi Emmanuel Igboke =

Nigeria nollywood actor (born 1998)

- Born: Ifeanyi Emmanuel Igboke; Enugu State
- Citizenship: Nigerian
- Education: York University
- Occupations: Actor movie producer.
- Known for: His role in Crosses.

Ifeanyi Emmanuel Igboke also known as Emmanuel Igboke (born 10 October 1998), is a Canadian-based Nigerian film actor and movie producer.

He is known for his role in the movie titled "Crosses", which earned him a Best Actor award at the Toronto International Nollywood Film Festival (TINFF) awards.

== Early life ==
He was born in October 10 in Enugu state but, grew up in Achara layout. Emmanuel is the last born out of seven children, He attended Konigin Des Friedens College in Enugu state and tertiary education at York University, Canada.

== Career ==
In 2022, Emmanuel Igboke won the Best Actor category with his movie titled "Crosses" and directed by Akeem Ogunmilade.

In 2022, Igboke was named among the top actor in Disapora making Nigeria proud by This Day.

== Filmography ==
Year	Title	Role	Ref
2021	No Minorities: The Ballad of the Macedonian Diaspora	Traveller #7	
2021	The Science of Fear	Ryan	
2021	Flint Strong	USA Team Officer	
2022	Crosses	Michael	
2022	Psalm 23	John	
2023	Facade		
2024	Realm 2	Hopeful	

=== As producer ===
- Cross (2022)

== Awards and nominations ==
Year	Award	Category	Result	Ref
2022	Toronto International Nollywood Film Festival (TINFF) Awards	Best actor	Won	
2022	Toronto International Nollywood Film Festival (TINFF) Awards	Best Movie Producer	Nominated	
