= Steph-Nora Okere =

Nigerian actress

- Born: Steph-Nora Okere; 26 April 1974 (age 52); Imo State
- Education: University of Ife
- Occupation: Actress
- Years active: 1994–present
- Awards: Special Recognition Award at City People Entertainment Awards in 2016

Steph-Nora Okere // (born 26 April 1974) is a Nigerian actress and scriptwriter. In 2015, she became the Vice President of the Script Writers Guild of Nigeria (SWGN). Okere was awarded the Special Recognition Award at the City People Entertainment Awards in 2016.

== Early life and education ==
Okere was born in Owerri, which is Imo State's capital, a southeastern geographical area of Nigeria occupied mainly by the Igbo people. At a young age, she migrated to Lagos state in southwest Nigeria and received her basic education at St Paul Primary School located in Ebute Metta, where she obtained her First School Leaving Certificate. Okere moved back to her state of origin to receive secondary education. She obtained her West African Senior School Certificate in Akwakuma Secondary School located in Imo State then obtained her BSc degree in Theatre Arts from the University of Ife.

== Career ==
Okere, before her debut into the Nigerian movie industry known commonly as Nollywood, was a stage actress, and debuted for the first time in the Nigerian movie industry in 1994 at the age of 20.

== Award ==
Okere won the Special Recognition Award at City People Entertainment Awards in 2016.

== Personal life ==
Okere has spoken publicly about her admiration for her colleague Jim Iyke.

Okere, although being Igbo, can speak the Yoruba language fluently.

== Selected filmography ==
- Pure Heart (2024) as Mrs. Madu
- Throne of Deceit (2022)
- Wars of the Fathers (2022) as Queen Marachi
- Situationship (2021) as Helen
- Godmother (2020) as Godmother
- African Time (2014) as Iron Lady
- Big Heart Treasure (2007) as First Lady
- Eleda Teju (2007)
- Angels Forever (2006) as Peggy
- Joy of a Mother (2006) as Ifeoma
- Destiny's Challenge (2005)
- Empire (2005)
- Fake Angel (2005) as Ann
- Immoral Act (2005)
- Aye Jobele (2005) as Mrs. Ray
- Circle Of Tears (2004) as Rita
- Dark Secret (2004)
- Indecent Girl (2004) as Adaku
- Lost Paradise (2004)
- Singles & Married (2004)
- Aristos (2003) as Cynthia
- Bleeding Love (2003)
- Sharon Stone (2022) as Kate
- Jungle Justice (2000) as Esther
- Oganigwe (1999) as Ada
- Heartless (1998) as Oby
