= Ado Gwanja =

Nigerian singer and actor (born 1991)

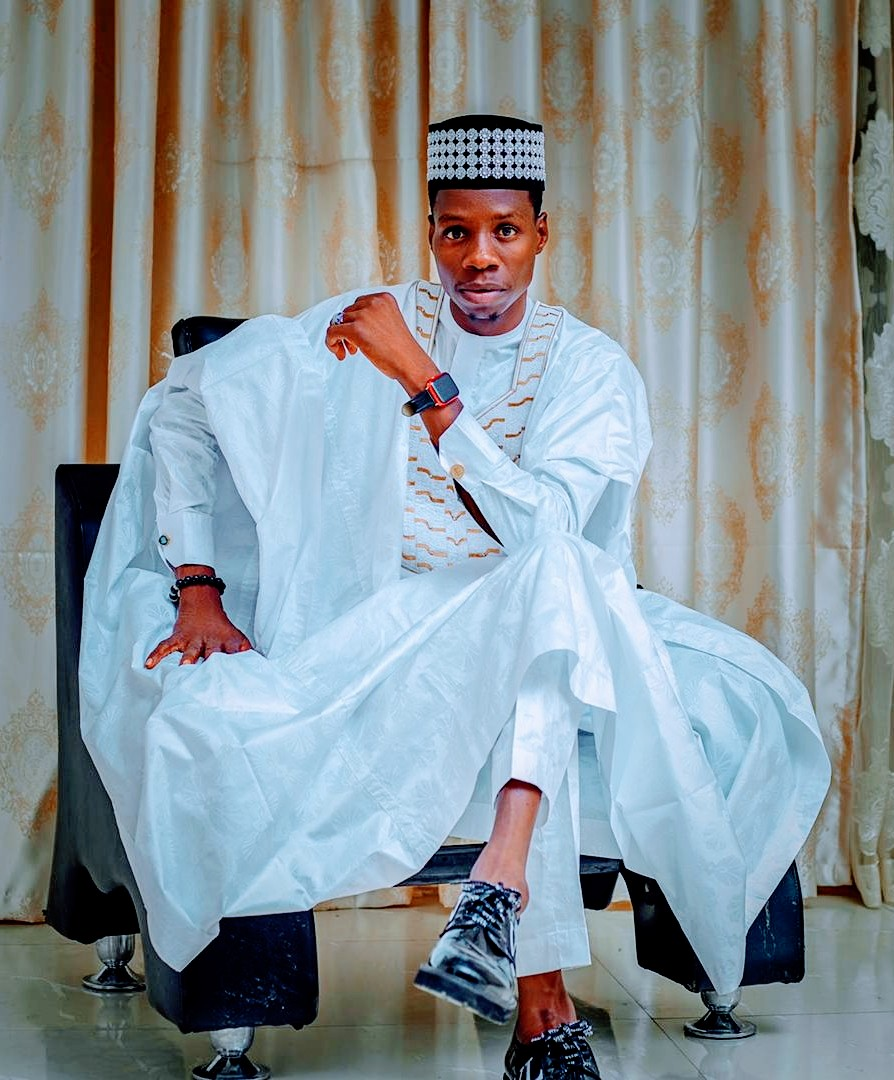
- Born: Ado Isah Gwanja; 22 January 1991 (age 35); Kano, Nigeria
- Citizenship: Nigeria
- Education: Federal College of Education Kano
- Occupations: Singer, Film Producer and Film Actor
- Years active: 2017-Present
- Known for: Musicians
- Children: 1 daughter
- Awards: Get Kano award Best Actor, Sani Abacha Youth Center Award Best Hausa artists Rhymes Pillars Crew

Ado Isah Gwanja (born 22 January 1991) is a Nigerian singer and actor in the Northern Nigerian film industry Kannywood. Gwanja is a well-known singer whose songs are very popular especially among women and youths in Northern Nigeria.

== Career ==
Gwanja first appeared in films in 2017, but spent a lot of time in the music industry before he started acting. Gwanja is often better known in music than in film. Gwanja specializes in his songs for women, he is invited to festivals where he sings his songs. He has named former Hausa singer Aminu Mai Dawayya as his mentor.

Some of Gwanja's most popular songs are Kujerar Tsakar Gida, Mamar-Mamar, Ɗakin Baƙuwa, Asha Rawa-rawa, Kilu ta Ja Bau, Kidan Mata, Warr, Chass, Luwai, etc.

== Albums ==
These are the Gwanja's albums;

Film	Year
Kujerar Tsakar Gida	2014
Indosa	2017
Matan Arewa	2016
Juya	2018
Ga Gwanja	2017
Tangaran	2021
Adama	2021

== Filmography ==
Indosa (2017)

Matan Arewa (2016)

Juya (2018)

Tangaran (2021)

Adama (2021)

== Awards ==
Gwanja has received numerous awards from individuals and organisations. Among the major awards received by Gwanja was the award given by Nigerian first lady Aisha Buhari. Other awards includes;

Year	Award	Category	Result
2019	Get Kano Award	Best Actor	Won
2018	Sani Abacha Youth Center Award	Best Actor award	Won
2018	National Association of Nigerian Students (NANS)	Best Women's Singer of the year	Won
2019	RS Fans Entertainment	Best Musician of the year b	Won
2018	Best Hausa Artists	Rhymes Pillars Crew.	Won

== Personal life ==
Ado Gwanja's Father is a Hausa man from Kano and his mother is from Shuwa Arabia Ethnicity from Borno State. Gwanja is a Muslim, he is married with one daughter.

== See also ==
- List of Nigerian musicians
- List of Hausa people
