= Ali Artwork =

Nigerian Actor and Editor (born 1992)

Ali Muhammad Idris
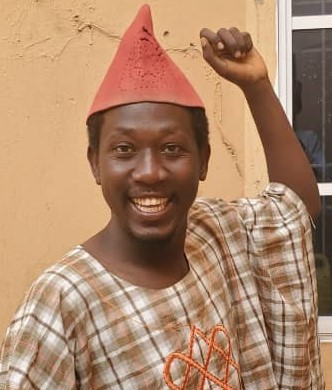
- Born: Ali Muhammad Idris; January 1, 1992 (age 34)
- Occupations: Actor, comedian, producer, script writer,
- Years active: 2011–present
- Known for: Comedy
- Title: Ali Artwork
- Spouse: Hauwa

Ali Muhammad Idris ( born January 1, 1992) is a Nigerian comedian, actor and film editor, known professionally as Ali Artwork. He is best known for his performances in several Hausa movies.

== Early life and education ==
Ali Artwork attended Sa’adatu Rimi College of Education Kumbotso, Kano, where he studied English and Hausa. However, he dropped out after his first year due to financial constraints. He is married to Hauwa.

== Awards and nominations ==
In 2016, Ali Artwork was nominated for the MTN Kannywood award as Best Editor for the movie Gwaska, and also the AMMA award as Best Movie Trailer Editor. He won the Merit Award by Arewa Creative Industry in the same year in Kaduna State.

Year	Award	Category	Result
2016	MTN Kannywood Award	Best Editor	Won
2016	AMMA Award	Best Movie Trailer Editor	Won
2016	Arewa Creative Industry	Best Actor	Won
2022	Nigerian Youth Achievers Award	Best Digital Comedian	Won

== Selected filmography ==
- Ɗan Marayan Zaki
- Gwaska
- Birnin Masoya
- Maja
- Ga Fili Ga Mai Doki
- Duniya Makaranta
- Soyayya Da Shaƙuwa
- Bayan Rai, Raddi
- Ashabul Kahfi
- Birnin Masoya
- mayene ni
- sai na auri Zara buhari
- Maɗagwal
- Kayan lefen Zara Buhari
- Baƙon Amerika
- Ali artwork almajiri
- kwamandan hisba
- Alhaji ya dawo
- Ɗan maula
- sai na zama gaye
- Ƙauraye
- Baban soyayya
- bansan tsoro
- Ɓarayin zaune
- Ƙanjamau
- Kansilan kauye
- Matar police
- wasan banza
- Kidnapper

== Notes ==
- "Hotunan Ali Artwork". knowledgebase.com.ng. 18 July 2022. Retrieved 2022-07-18.
