= Aminu Shariff =

Nigerian filmmaker, director, story writer and TV personality (born 1972)

- Born: 17 February 1977 (age 49); Galadanci, Kano, Nigeria
- Education: Political Science
- Alma mater: Bayero University, Kano, Kano, Nigeria
- Occupations: Filmmaker, story writer, director, TV producer, presenter
- Years active: 1996–present
- Notable credit: Ukuba
- Awards: See below

Aminu Aliyu Shariff also known as Aminu Momoh (born 17 February 1977) is a Nigerian filmmaker, director, story writer, TV personality, and magazine editor.

== Filmography ==
Aminu Shariff's filmography

Year	Title	Role	Genre	Production company
2009	Duniyar Sama	Actor	Drama	Movies World
2010	Guguwa	Actor	Drama	Movies World
2010	Tuwon Tulu	Actor	Drama	
2010	Tuwon Kasa	Actor	Drama	
2011	Kishiya ko 'Yar Uwa	Actor	Drama	
2012	Abu Naka	Actor	Drama	
2012	Ukuba	Actor	Drama	Movies World
2013	Kauna	Actor	Drama	
2013	A Cuci Maza	Actor	Drama	AlRahus Film Production
2015	Ana Wata Ga Wata	Actor	Drama	G. G. Production
2015	Gidan Farko	Actor	Drama	I. A. I. Entertainment
2015	Kayar Ruwa	Actor	Drama	
2017	Rumana	Actor	Drama	Hikima Multimedia kano

== Awards ==
List of awards received by Aminu Aliyu Shariff.

Year	Award	Category	Film	Result
2001	Arewa Film Award	Best Actor	Ukuba	Won
2005	Gamji Awards	Best Actor of Year	Kauna	Won
2009	Afro-Hollywood Award	Best Actor (Hausa Category)	Duniyar Sama	Won
2010	Kano State Censorship Award	Best Actor	Makamashi	Won
2013	City People Entertainment Awards	Best Actor	Kannywood Personality	Won

== See also ==
- List of Nigerian actors
- List of Nigerian film directors
