= Ali Jita =

Nigerian Hausa musician (born 1983)

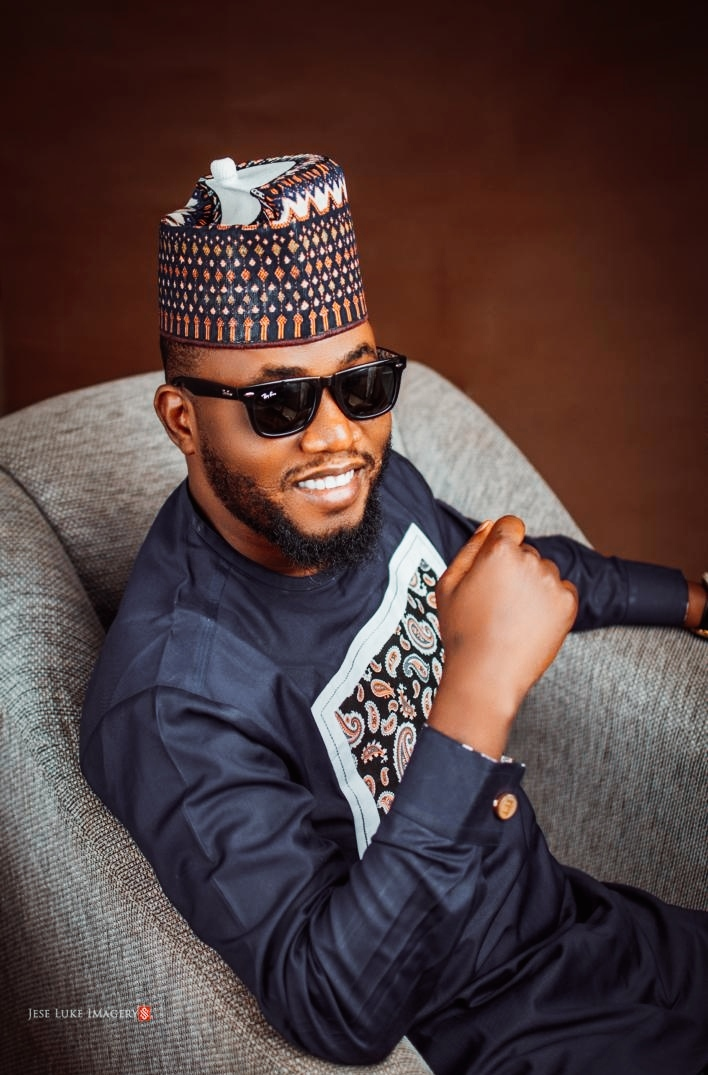
- Ali Isah Jita
- Born: Ali Isah Jita; 15 July 1983 (age 43); Kano State, Nigeria
- Education: Public Administration and Computer
- Occupations: Singer; Producer; songwriter; film director; producer
- Years active: 2006–present
- Spouse: Nafisa Ali
- Children: 5

Ali Isah Jita (born 15 July 1983), simply known as Ali Jita, is a Nigerian singer, songwriter and musician.

== Early life ==
Ali Isah known with stage name: Ali Jita is a Nigerian singer, songwriter and musician. He was born on 15 July 1983 simply known as Ali Jita, in Gyadi Gyadi area of Kumbotso local government Kano state, Nigeria. He was raised in the Shagari quarters of Gyadi Gyadi. As a little boy, his father moved his family from Kano to Lagos, then to Abuja due to his business.

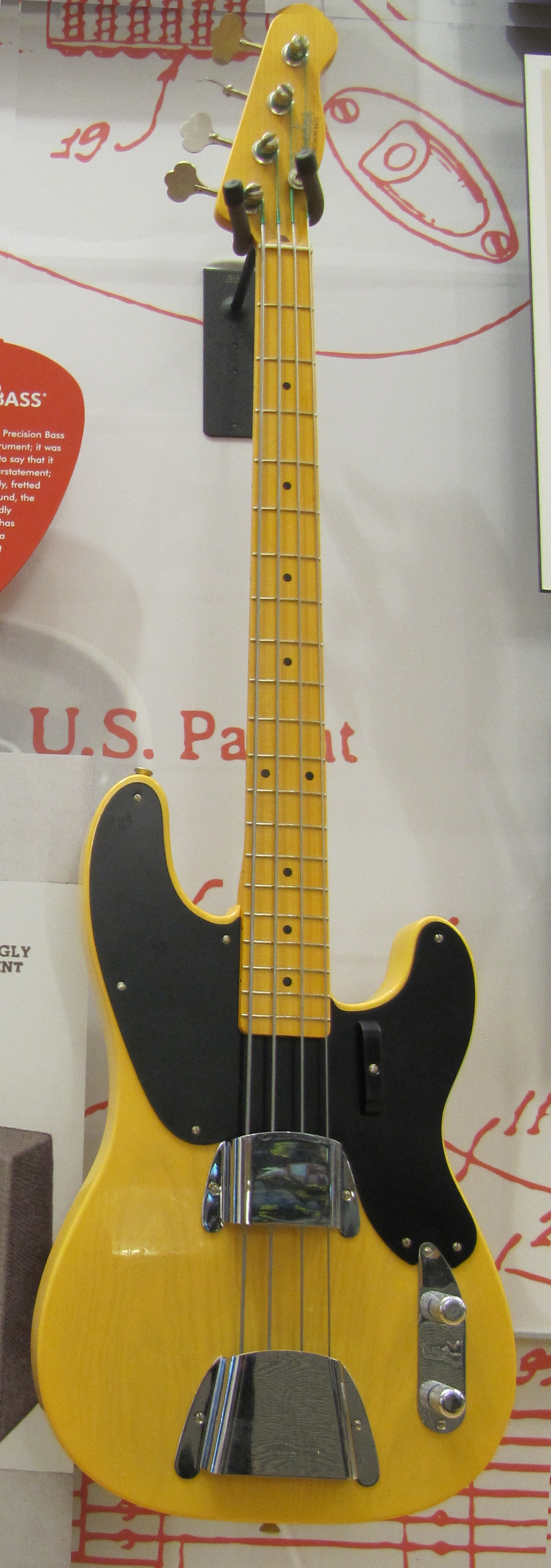
Ali jita derives his title from Guitar due to his love to it.

== Education ==
Ali Jita started his nursery/elementary education in Shagari Quarters. He then did his primary and junior secondary education at Bonikam Barracks, Victoria Island, Lagos state. He finished his senior secondary education in Abuja. He furthered his studies in Federal College of Education Kano where he obtained a National Diploma in Public administration. He also studied Computer Science at the Intersystem ICT School where he obtained a Diploma in Computer Management.

== Career ==
Most of Ali jita's songs were used in the Kannywood film industry, but some of his albums were sold out to other Hausa film Industries. Ali Jita also is a figure that attends for celebrating Birthdays, Weddings and Concerts across Nigeria and Africa at large. His associates include Nazifi Asnanic, Fati Niger, Naziru M Ahmad, etc. He also collaborated with Umar M Shareef and produced a song called Mama, he produced several singles including Sadaki, Matan Arewa, with most recent Uwargida etc. His latest single is the song Hubbi Aisha produced in 2025. Ali Jita's song called Love was chosen the second best Hausa music of the year 2018 by BBC Hausa. Ali Jita uses Ingausa musical style, a mixture of Hausa and English. He use the style to write and sing the song. In 2019 he produced the official video of Arewa angel together with another Kannywood actress Rahama Sadau, he also produced another official video of the song called Love with the actress Hadiza Gabon. He also organised a sallah celebration.

== Discography ==
=== Albums ===
Album	Songs	Year	Counts
Labarin duniya	Labarin duniya	2015	12
Zakin maza	Maza	2016	Unknown
Mata		2018	Unknown
Mai Jita	Fati-fati		
Gimbiyar Mata	Aboki		
Love	Arewa angel		
Jita	Gimbiya	2020	
Jita	Sadaki	2024	
Sautin Arewa	Farin Wata	2025	
Jita	Dawo Gida	2025	
Jita	Sadaki	2024	
Single	Uwargida	2025	
Single	HUBBI Aisha	2025	
Single	Darling	2026	

Ki

== Awards and honors ==
Ali Jita has received many awards in his musical career, the awards are over 15 awards in counts, they are as follows:

== See also ==
- List of Nigerian musicians
- List of Hausa people
