= Naziru M Ahmad =

Nigerian singer and songwriter (born 1986)

- Born: 4 September 1986 (age 40); Kano, Nigeria
- Occupations: singer, songwriter, director, actor
- Spouse: He is married to 2 wives
- Children: 4 children including Islama
- Family: Aminu Saira Misbahu M Ahmad
- Awards: Best Kannywood Singer of the year 2013

Naziru M Ahmad also known as Sarkin Waka (born 4 September 1986) is a Nigerian singer, songwriter and actor. Naziru was turbaned as Sarkin Wakan Sarkin Kano (Chief Singer of the Emir of Kano) in December 2018.

A musician with specialization in Royalty who in 2022 released a new music "Sai mun Bata Wuta".

== Discography ==
=== Studio albums ===
Ahmad sings more than 300 songs.

- Musa Jidda
- Lamido
- wasiqa zuwa ga shugaban kasa
- Sabon Sarki
- Sunusi Lamido
- Mati Da Lado
- Mata Kudau Turame
- Dallatun Zazzau
- Matar Jami'a
- Jarman Wudil
- Ado Bayero
- Wani Gari
- Yata Fadimatu
- Ahmad Musa
- Dan Giya
- Gangar Jikinta Na Aura
- Sardaunan Samaru
- Wani Gari • 2014
- Sunusi Na Biyu
- Hanyar Kano 1
- Murnar Sabon Sarki
- Mai Abu Bakwai / Sardaunan Gora
- Kanin Muji
- I Love U Forever and Ever Soyayya5
- Umar Turawa
- Abdulhalim
- Ba Mutum Bane
- Sultan Biyamin Sarkin Das
- Na'iman Da'iman
- Usman Zannuraini Musa Jidda
- Ghazali Maitama and Farida Chanchangi
- Muhammad Rahman
- Umaru Ahmad and Hadiza Abdallah
- Kuliyan Zazzau
- Na kulle da makulli
- sai mun bata wuta

== Career ==
Ahmad has spoken of his love for Hausa music icons like Mamman Shata and Dankwairo. "To be candid, I can't specifically say what attracted my soul to music, but I had nurtured a dream of being a musician since I was seven. I started singing when there was no music studio in Kano. I would sing in front of gatherings and even as then I was applauded and celebrated. I went fully into music in 2000."
