= Nazifi Asnanic =

Nigerian Hausa singer

- Born: Nazifi Abdulsalam Yusuf; 2 February 1982 (age 44); Kano, Nigeria
- Occupations: Singer, songwriter, director, producer
- Years active: 2000–present
- Notable credit: Dawo Dawo
- Children: 2
- Website: http://www.asnanic.com

Nazifi Abdulsalam Yusuf ( born 2 February 1982) better known as his stage name Nazifi Asnanic is a Nigerian singer, songwriter, director, and producer. He was born and raised in the ancient city of Kano. Nazifi Asnanic, often referred to as the Golden Voice, is recognized as one of the most successful Hausa artists of all time in the history of Kannywood. He has received a number of awards and nominations including City People Entertainment Awards as the best musician in 2014. He was also among the Kannywood stars that received an award by Zamfara State government of Nigeria for their tremendous effort and contribution toward uniting and sustaining Hausa culture. Nazifi Asnanic has featured, produced, and directed numbers of film in Kannywood.

== Career ==
Nazifi Abdulsalam Yusuf (Nazifi Asnanic) started his musical career in early 2000s. In 2002, he dropped his debut album with 10 songs including Dawo Dawo. He caught the attention of directors and producers like Ali Nuhu and Aminu Saira where he sang for FKD production and Saira Movies in Ga Duhu Ga Haske and Sai Wata Rana. Nazifi Asnanic released 10 more albums and sold millions of copies in Nigeria and worldwide making him one of the most successful in Kannywood. Apart from singing and music production, Nazifi has produced and directed several movies such as Rai da Buri, Shu’uma, Ba’asi and many more.

== Discography ==
Studio albums

- Labarina (2009)
- Daga Ni Sai Ke (2010)
- Bunjuma (2011)
- Dan Marayan Zaki (2012)
- Dakin Amarya (2013)
- Rayuwa (2014)
- Kambu
- Ruwan Zuma (2013)
- Abu uku

== Filmography ==
Film	Year
Bilkisu Mai Gadon Zinari	ND
Dare Da Yawa	ND
Ga Fili Ga Mai Doki	ND
India Rai	ND
Kallo Daya	ND
Makauniyar Yarinya	ND
Miyatti... Miyatti	ND
Almajira	2008
Jamila Da Jamilu	2009
Mata Da Miji	2010
Ga Duhu Da Haske	2010
Muradi	2011
Rai Da Buri	2011
Toron Giwa	2011
Dan Marayan Zaki	2012
Dare Daya	2012
Gaba Da Gabanta	2013
Lamiraj	2013
Rayuwa Bayan Mutuwa	2013
Shu’uma	2013
