= Adam A. Zango =

Nigerian actor, musician and dancer

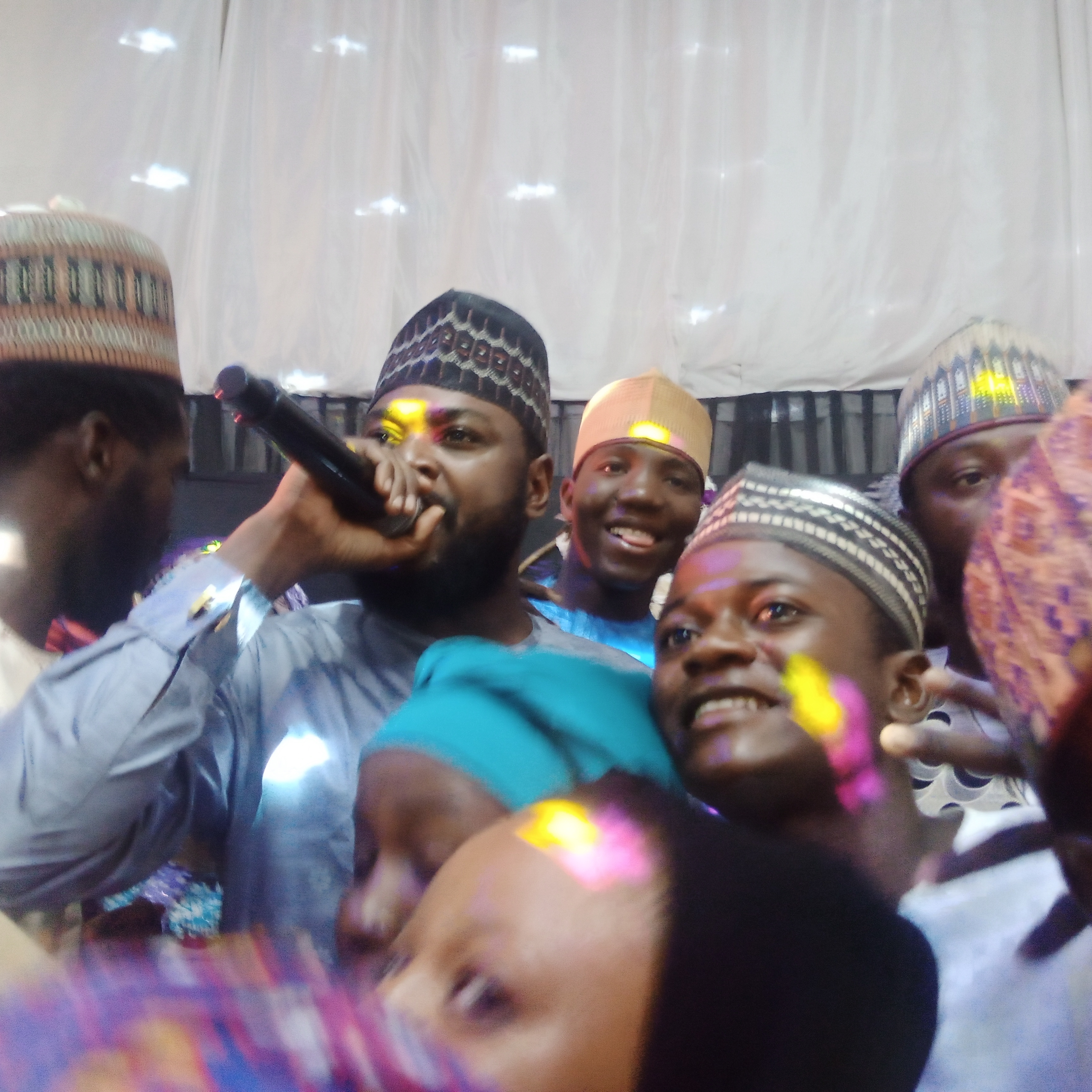
- Zango with his fans performing on stage
- Born: Adamu Abdullahi Zango; 1 October 1983 (age 42); Zangon Kataf, Kaduna, Nigeria
- Occupations: Actor; singer; dancer; philanthropist
- Spouse: Divorced
- Children: Haidar A. Zango
- Website: adamzango.com

Adamu Abdullahi Zango (born 1 October 1983) is a Nigerian actor, singer, dancer, scriptwriter, film producer, and philanthropist, who has appeared in over 100 films and received many accolades. has worked with prominent actors such as Ali Nuhu, Kanayo O. Kanayo, Abba El-Mustapha, Adam Abdullahi Adam, Sani Danja.

== Early life and education ==
Adam Abdullahi Zango was born on 1 October 1985 at Zango local government in Kaduna State, Nigeria to the Hausa Muslim family of Mallam Abdullahi and Hajiya Yelwa Abdullahi.

== Career ==
Zango's musical career started from secondary school activities in social club events which he used to represent his school. Zango entered the Hausa film industry in 2001 as a music composer. He started his acting profession as a low level actor and appeared in over 100 Hausa movies.

== Personal life ==
Zango has been married six times, with each marriage ending in divorce: to Amina (2006), with whom he had a son, Haidar; Aisha of Zaria, with whom he had three sons; Maryam of Nasarawa State; actress Maryam Yola, whom he married in 2013; Ummul Kulsum, a Cameroonian with whom he had his first daughter, Murjanatu; and Safiya Umar (also known as Maimuna "Pretty"), whom he married in April 2019. In August 2026, Zango confirmed his separation from Safiya, explaining publicly that the couple had both tested for the AS genotype and separated to avoid the risk of having children with sickle cell anaemia, a decision that drew public criticism from social media personality G-Fresh Al-Amin. Zango is reported to be the father of seven children across his marriages.

== Prison ==
Adam A. Zango was remanded in prison for violating the Kano State Censorship Board's law in 2007 for release of his music video album Bahaushiya.

== Charity ==
In October 2019, Zango paid 47 million Naira for children and orphans to further their studies.

== Filmography ==
Film	Year	Role
Yayana	ND	
Ƴar Agadez	2011	
Adamsi	2011	
Addini ko Al 'ada	2011	
Adon Gari	2011	
Ahlul Kitab	2011	
Alkawarina	2011	
Albashi (The Salary)	2002	
Andamali	2013	
Ango da Amarya	ND	
Artabu	2009	
Aska Tara	ND	
Auren Tagwaye	ND	
Baban Sadik	2012	
Babban Yaro	2011	
Balaraba	2010	
Basaja	2013	
Bayan Rai	2014	
Bita Zai Zai	ND	
Dajin So	ND	
Dan mazari	2007	Aminu
Dare	2015	
Dijangala	2008	Hafizu
Duniya Budurwar Wawa	ND	
Dutsen Gulbi	2013	
Farar Saka	ND	
Fataken Dare	ND	
Ga Duhu Ga Haske	2010	
Ga Fili Ga Mai Doki	ND	
Gaba da Gabanta	2013	
Gambiza	ND	
Gamdakatar	ND	
Gwamnati	2003	
Gwanaye	2003	
Gwaska	2016	
Hadizalo	ND	
Hindu	2014	
Hisabi	2017	
Hubbi	2012	
Ijaabaah	ND	
Jamila	2016	
Kaddara Ko Fansa	2014	
Kama da Wane	2014	
Kare Jini	ND	
Kolo	ND	
Kundin Tsari	ND	
Laifin Dadi	2010	
Larai	ND	
Madugu	ND	
Masu Aji	ND	
Mata ko Ya	2015	
Matsayin So	ND	
Mazan Fama	ND	
Matsayin So	ND	
Mazan Fama	2015	
Mukaddari	ND	
Murmushin Alkawari	ND	
Mutallab	2011	
Nai Maka Rana	ND	
Namamajo	ND	
Nas	2013	
Ni Da Ke Mun Dace	2013	
Najeriya Da Nijar	2012	
Nusaiba	ND	
Rabin Jiki	2011	
Rai A Kwalba	ND	
Rai Dai	2012	
Rawar Gani	ND	
Rintsin Kauna	ND	
Rumana	2017	
Ruwan Ido	ND	
Ruwan Jakara	ND	
Sai Wata Rana	2010	
Salma	ND	
Shahuda	2012	
Siyayya Da Shakuwa	2014	
Soyayyar Facebook	2010	
Tarkon Kauna	ND	
Tsangaya	ND	
Ummi da Adnan	2011	
Walijam	2010	
Wata Rayuwa	2013	
Ya Salam	ND	
Sai Wata Rana	2010	Abdulwahab
Zarar Bunu	2011	
Rai Dai	2012	Mukhtar
A Ci Bulus	2014	A. Zango
Hindu	2015	Kaila
Akwai Dalili	2016	Nura
Zulumi	2017	
Matar Mijina	2018	
Sadauki	2019	Sadauki
Yanayi	2019	
Karamin Sani	2020	
Mati a Zazzau	2020	Yarima
Shaheeda	2021	Haidar
Lamba	2022	
Almajiri	2022	Bad man
Mai Martaba (Your Highness)	2024	Shugaba

== Gallery ==
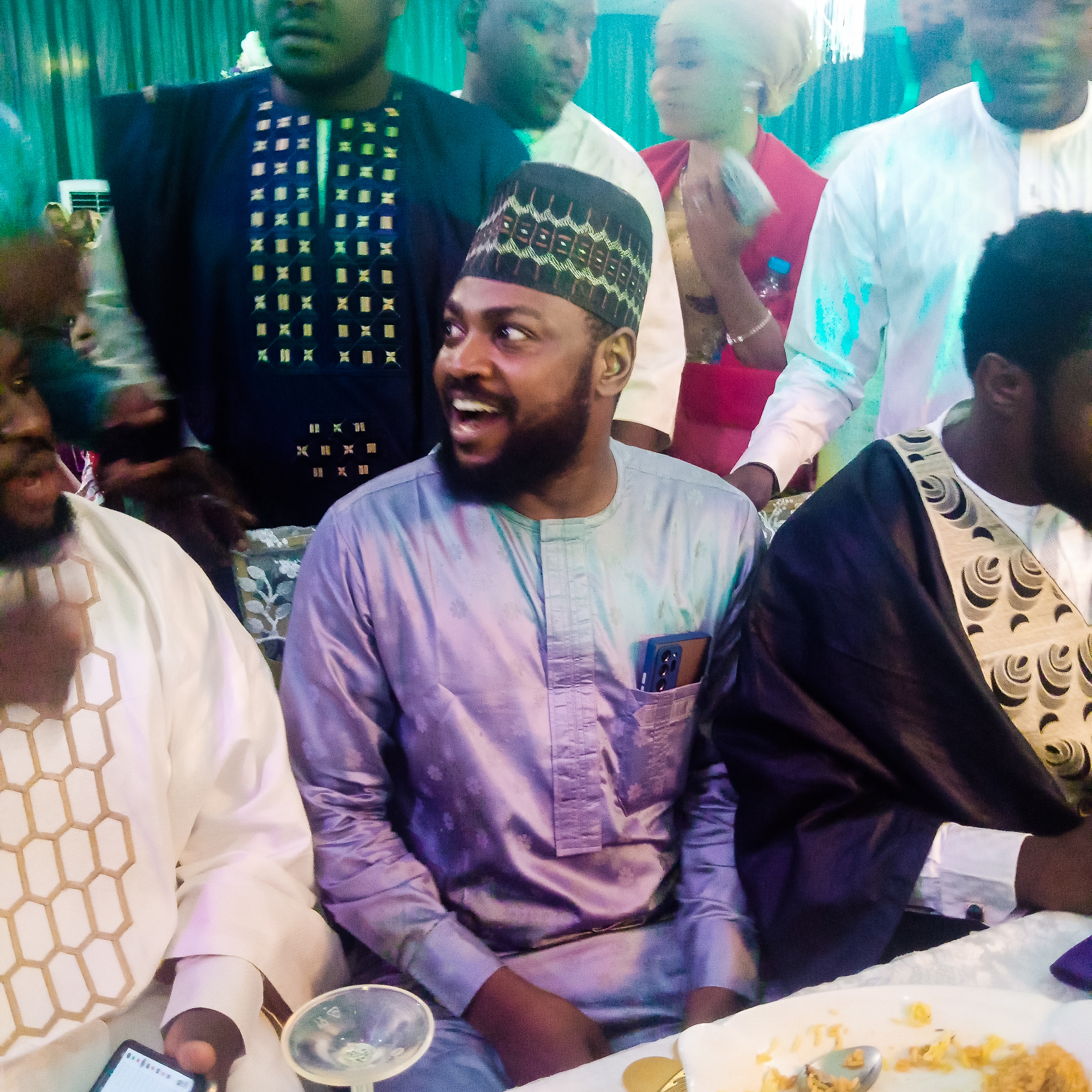
With friends

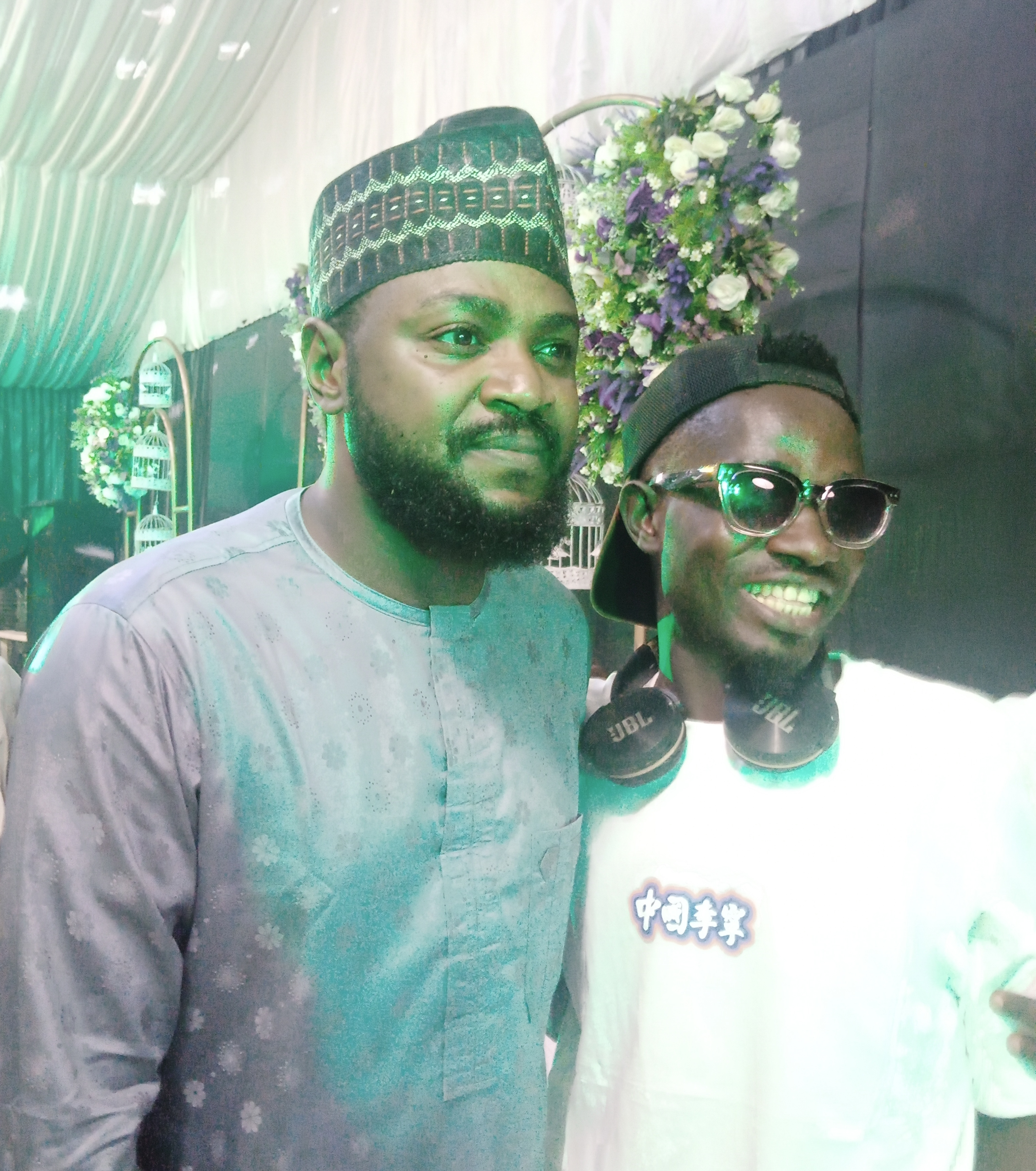
With his fan

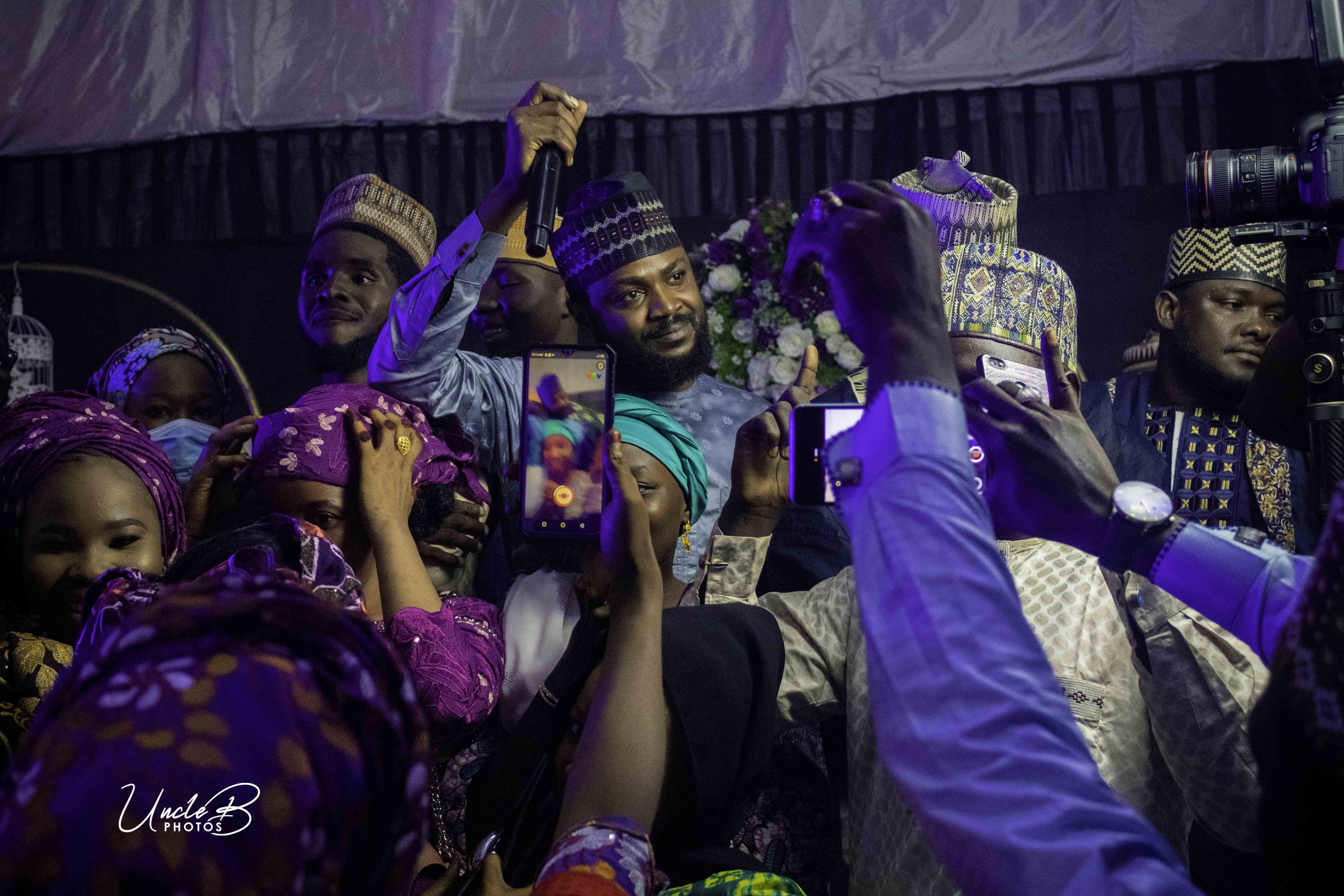

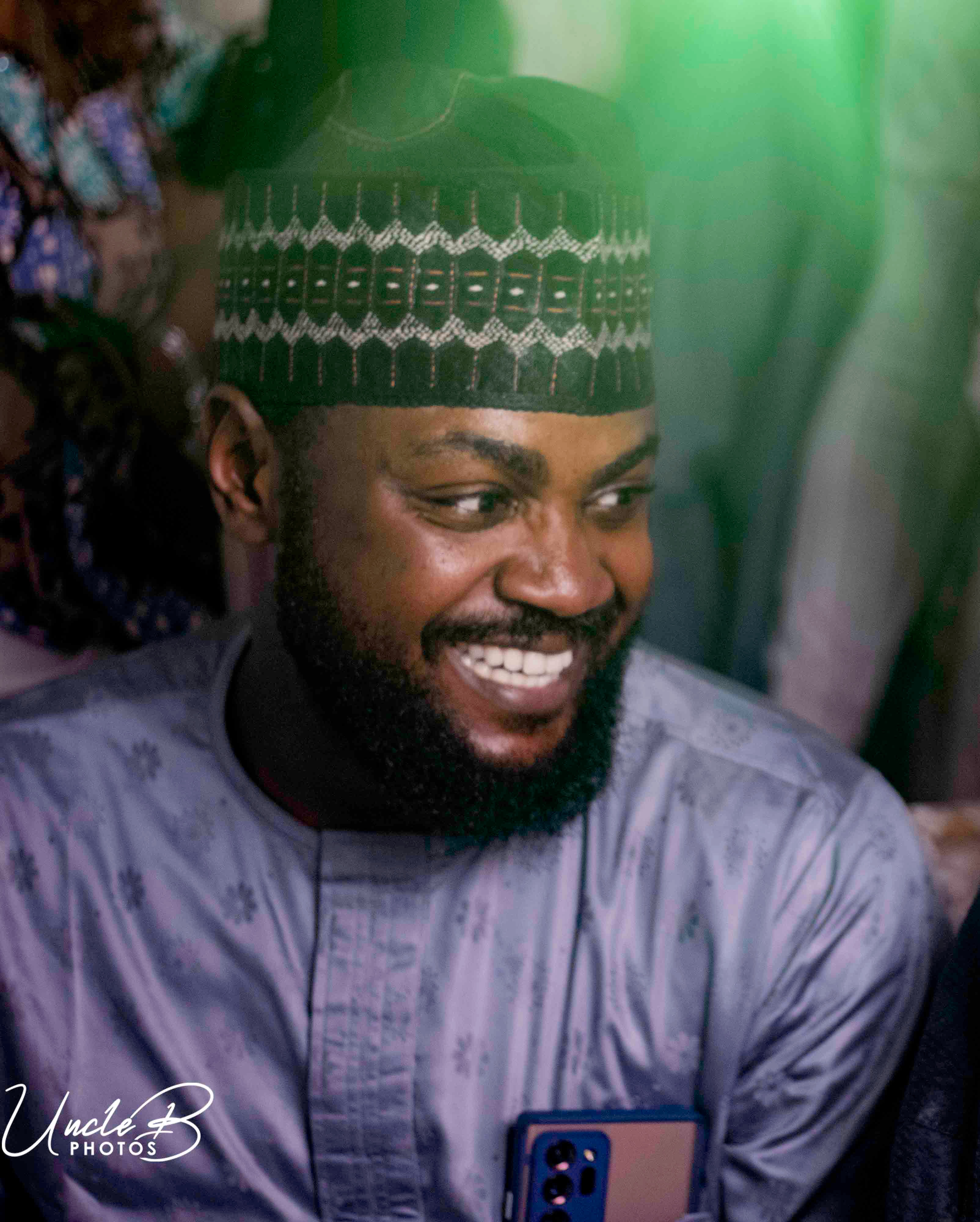
