= Hausa-language cinema =

Hausa-language film industry of Nigeria

Hausa-language cinema industry of Northern Nigeria
- No. of screens: 150 (2009)
  - Per capita: ???

Produced feature films (2011)
- Fictional: 1000

Number of admissions
- Total: 500,000

Hausa-language cinema, known informally as Kannywood, is the Hausa-language film industry of northern Nigeria. It is based in Kano.

== Kannywood ==
Kannywood is the sobriquet for Hausa-language cinema, which is a part of the larger Nigerian cinema, known as Nollywood, which includes other production centres producing films in many other Nigerian languages. The term Kannywood is a portmanteau derived from the city name of Kano and Hollywood, the center of the American film industry, and was coined in 1999 by Sunusi Shehu Daneji, publisher of Tauraruwa ("Star") Magazine to capture the growing Hausa video film scene, from which point it became the popular reference term for the film industry of northern Nigeria. The term preceded the label Nollywood which originated with New York Times journalist Norimitsu Onishi in 2001 in referencing the Lagos-based film industry.

== History ==
The Hausa-language cinema slowly evolved from the productions of RTV Kaduna and Radio Kaduna in the 1960s. Veterans such as Dalhatu Mustapha Bawa and Kasimu Yero pioneered drama productions that became popular with the Northern audience.

In the 1970s and 1980s, Usman Baba Pategi and Mamman Ladan introduced Hausa comedy to the Northern audience.

=== 1990s: Bollywood influence ===
The 1990s saw a dramatic change in the Hausa language cinema, eager to attract more Hausa audiences who find Bollywood movies more attractive, Kannywood; a cinematic synthesis of Indian and Hausa culture evolved and became extremely popular. Turmin Danya ("The Draw"), 1990, is usually cited as the first commercially successful Kannywood film. It was quickly followed by others like Gimbiya Fatima, In Da So Da Kauna, Munkar, Badakala and Kiyarda Da Ni. New actors like Ibrahim Mandawari and Hauwa Ali Dodo became popular and set the stage for the emergence of super-star female actresses later on.

=== 2000s Kannywood ===
By 2012, over 2000 film companies were registered with the Kano State Filmmakers Association.

A local censoring committee created by Kanywood producers and marketers was converted into a board and named Kano State Censorship Board in 2001 by Governor Rabiu Kwankwaso. Dahiru Beli was appointed the first Executive Secretary of the board.

== Music ==
Songwriters and singers who produce or perform music in Hausa films include Nazifi Asnanic, Naziru M Ahmad, Ali Jita,, Fati Nijar, and Umar M Sharif.

== Critics ==
=== Islamic critics ===
In 2003, with the rise of the Izala and the coming to power of Ibrahim Shekarau, the then ultra-religious government of Kano initiated an iconoclastic campaign against Kannywood. Numerous movies deemed irreligious were censored and some film makers were jailed. This reversed some of the gains Kannywood had made and allowed the Southern Nigerian film industry to supersede it.

=== Problems with government ===
In 2007, the Hiyana Affair: when the sex tape of a popular actress became public led to a severe backlash from the then Islamist government of Kano State under Ibrahim Shekarau. Shekarau went on to appoint a Director General for the censorship board, Abubakar Rabo Abdulkareem, with the support of the Izala Society and other Islamist organisations, Kannywood and the equally popular Hausa romantic novel industry were severely censored, actors, actresses and writers were jailed by the state government and books and other media materials were burnt by the Governor himself. In 2011 the replacement of the Islamist government by a much more liberal government led by the PDP led to a more favourable atmosphere for the industry. In 2019, following the re-election of governor Abdullahi Umar Ganduje as governor of Kano State, a new spate of arrests of musicians and filmmakers was launched by the Censorship Board under its Executive Secretary, Isma'il Na'abba Afakallahu. A movie director, Sunusi Oscar, and a musician, Naziru M. Ahmad, were arrested and taken to court over accusations that they released songs without the permission of the censor. The duo were released on bail. The opposition Kwankwasiyya Movement stated that the arrests were politically motivated because the accused persons were considered as sympathizers of the Peoples Democratic Party in the last general election.

== See also ==
- Culture of Northern Nigeria
- List of Kannywood actors
