= List of Hausa people =

List of Hausa notable people

This is a list of notable Hausa people.

== Emirs and Sultans ==
- Daurama
- Faruk Umar Faruk
- Queen Amina
- Awwal Ibrahim
- Muhammad Rumfa
- Yunfa
- Queen Sarraounia
- Ado Bayero
- Sanusi Lamido Sanusi
- Aminu Ado Bayero

== Footballers ==
- Abiola Dauda
- Abubakari Yakubu
- Abdoul Aziz Ibrahim
- Abdul Fatawu Dauda
- Abdul Majeed Waris
- Abdul Mumin
- Abdulrahman Bashir
- Ahmed Musa
- Ahmed Wadah
- Alhassan Yusuf
- Alhassan Wakaso
- Amadou Moutari
- Fatawu Mohammed
- Habib Mohamed
- Haruna Babangida
- Ibrahim Rabiu
- Ibrahim Sadiq
- Issah Abdul Basit
- Illiasu Shilla
- Jamal Haruna
- Lalas Abubakar
- Masahudu Alhassan
- Mohammed Abu
- Mohammed-Awal Issah
- Mohammed Dauda
- Mohammed Rabiu
- Mohammed Razak
- Mohammed Lamine
- Mohamed Tijani
- Moussa Maâzou
- Mujaid Sadick
- Sani Kaita
- Shehu Abdullahi
- Tijani Babangida
- Umar Sadiq
- Mubarak Wakaso
- Rabiu Ali
- Yunus Musah
- Jamal Idris
- Mohammed Aminu
- Lukman Haruna
- Seidu Abubakari
- Yussif Mubarik
- Yussif Moussa
- Zaidu Sanusi
- Issah Gabriel Ahmed
- Mohammed Alhassan
- Mohammed Kudus
- Mohammed Salisu
- Osman Bukari
- Said Ahmed Said
- Salou Ibrahim
- Saminu Abdullahi
- Suleiman Abdullahi

== Islamic clerics ==
- Sheikh Ibrahim Khaleel
- Ja'afar Mahmud Adam
- Muhammad Auwal Albani Zaria
- Sani Yahaya Jingir
- Aminu Ibrahim Daurawa
- Osman Nuhu Sharubutu
- Ahmad Sulaiman Ibrahim
- Nasuru Kabara
- Ahmad Bamba
- Kabiru Gombe
- Abdullahi Bala Lau
- Bello Yabo
- Habib Goni Kolo

== Musicians ==
=== Traditional ===
- Dan Maraya Jos
- Barmani Coge
- Mamman Shata
- Aisha Musa Ahmad

=== Modern ===
- Nazifi Asnanic
- Naziru M Ahmad
- Nura M Inuwa
- Sadiq Zazzabi
- TY Shaban
- Ado Gwanja
- Ali Jita
- Aminu Ala

== Architects ==
- Babban Gwani

== Politicians ==
- Abubakar Tafawa Balewa
- Aminu Kano
- Ahmadu Bello
- Shehu Shagari
- Musa Yar'Adua
- Muhammadu Ribadu
- Umaru Yar'Adua
- General Muhammadu Buhari
- Kashim Shettima
- Barrister Ibrahim Shehu Shema
- Aminu Bello Masari
- Nasir Ahmad El-Rufai
- Senator Garba Yakubu Lado Danmarke
- Senator Kabiru Gaya
- Maitama Sule
- Kabir Tukur Ibrahim
- Mustapha Baba Shehuri
- Amb. Ahmed Bolori
- Muhammad Inuwa Yahaya
- Ibrahim Hassan Dankwambo
- Attahiru Bafarawa
- Aliyu Magatakarda Wamakko
- Abdullahi Adamu
- Bala Mohammed
- Mohammed Danjuma Goje
- Abubakar Rimi
- Ibrahim Shekarau
- Rabiu Musa Kwankwaso
- Abdullahi Sule
- Babagana Zulum
- Atiku Abubakar
- Bukar Abba Ibrahim
- Ghali Umar Na'Abba
- Aminu Waziri Tambuwal
- Isa Yuguda
- Abubakar Habu Hashidu
- Abdu Dawakin Tofa
- Mohammed Badaru Abubakar
- Umar Namadi
- Namadi Sambo
- Muhammadu Abubakar Rimi
- Abdullahi Umar Ganduje
- Abba Kabir Yusuf
- Uba Sani
- Bello Matawalle
- Halilu Kundila
- Sule Lamido
- Labaran Abdul Madari
- Kabiru Alhassan Rurum
- Yusuf Abdullahi Ata
- Abba Kabir Yusuf
- Aminu Abdussalam Gwarzo
- Ismaila Isa Funtua
- Hassan Al-Turabi
- Samira Bawumia
- Ahmed Ramadan (politician)
- Aboubakar Moukadas Nouré
- Nasir Yusuf Gawuna~

== Jurists ==
- Sidi Bage
- Tanko Muhammad

== Journalists ==
- Jamilah Tangaza

== Businesspeople ==
- Aliko Dangote
- Alhassan Dantata
- Alhaji Aminu Dantata
- Alhaji Isyaku Rabiu
- Alhaji Abdulsamad Rabiu
- Bashir Dalhatu
- Dahiru Mangal
- Auwalu Abdullahi Rano
- Kabo Air
- Umaru Mutallab

== Academic ==
=== Vice chancellors ===
- Bayero University
  - Attahiru Jega
  - Abubakar Adamu Rasheed
  - Muhammad Yahuza Bello
- Ahmadu Bello University
  - Abdullahi Mustapha
  - Ibrahim Garba
- National Open University of Nigeria
  - Abdalla Uba Adamu

=== Others ===
- Abba Gumel
- Rabia Salihu Sa'id

== Military ==
- Mansur Dan Ali
- Native Officer Ali
- Mamman Kontagora
- Tukur Yusuf Buratai
- Hamza Al-Mustapha

== Police ==
- Hafiz Ringim
- Suleiman Abba

== Writers ==
- Zaynab Alkali
- Hauwa Ali
- Abubakar Imam

== Actors ==
- Ali Nuhu
- Rahama Sadau
- Mansur Makeup
- Adam A Zango
- Saratu Gidado
- Lawan Ahmad
- Yakubu Muhammed
- Maryam Booth
- Sadiq Sani Sadiq
- Hadiza Aliyu
