= Bako =

Bako may refer to:

== People ==
- Bako (name)
- Bako (footballer), a nickname for the Lebanese footballer Abou Bakr Al-Mel

== Places ==
- Bako National Park, Malaysia
- Bako, Ethiopia
- Bako, Ivory Coast
- Bako, Sarawak, an administrative area under the authority of Dewan Bandaraya Kuching Utara, Malaysia
- Bako, the former name of Makung City, Taiwan
- Bakó, the Hungarian name for Bacău, Romania
- A nickname for Bakersfield, California, US

== Other uses ==
- Bako language, a dialect of Aari language
- Bako (bug), a genus of lace bugs in the family Tingidae
- Bako Motors, a Tunisian electric car brand

== See also ==
- Baku, capital of Azerbaijan
