= Kingdom of Zazzau =

Pre-colonial Hausa kingdom in Nigeria

Kingdom of Zazzau Sarautar Zazzau (Hausa)
- Status: State from 1010-1902; Currently a non-sovereign monarchy in Nigeria
- Capital: Turunku (1010 – 15th century); Zazzau (15th century – 1902)
- Common languages: Hausa; Fulfulde; Arabic
- Religion: Hausa animism, later replaced by Islam
- Demonym: Zazzagawa
- Government: Sarauta
- Sarki
  - ?: Gunguma (first)
  - 1576-1610: Amina (disputed)
  - 1802-1804: Makkam
  - 1897-1902: Muhammad Kwassau (last sovereign)
  - 2020-present: Ahmed Nuhu Bamalli
| Succeeded by |
| Abuja Emirate |

The Kingdom of Zazzau was a Hausa kingdom centred on the city of Zazzau (now Zaria) in modern-day northern Nigeria established sometime in the early second millennium, and endured until its conquest during the jihad of Usman dan Fodio in 1804. Following this, its dynasty was replaced by a Fulani (one subordinate to the Sokoto Caliphate), and the polity continues to exist today as the Zaria Emirate, a non-sovereign monarchy in Nigeria. The current emir of Zaria is Ahmed Nuhu Bamalli, who succeeded the former emir in 2020, the late Shehu Idris.

== History ==
=== Origins ===
The early history of Zazzau is unclear. The most important source for the origins of Zazzau is the Chronicle of Zaria, composed in the early 20th century and based on oral tradition. According to tradition, the kingdom was founded by Gunguma, a descendant of the legendary Bayajidda. Zazzau's regnal list dates this to 1010 CE.

Scholars have had differing views on the early history of Zazzau. Abdullahi Smith considered the Hausa to have inhabited the area for over a millennium before a state emerged. There were various city-state-type polities, with the most powerful being Turunku and Kufena, who had authority over the others. In the late 15th century, Turunku ruler Bakwa took power in Kufena, and built a capital just east of Kufena, which was named "Zaria" after her/his (Note: Bakwa's gender is disputed.) daughter.

Murray Last theorised the area to have been inhabited by a Kamuku federation named Kangoma from 1200 CE, who were the descendants of the Nok culture. Accordingly, the Kangoma kingdom, renamed Zegzeg, emerged at Turunku after the federation's collapse, with the Hausa assuming control as late as 1641, however this is not supported by linguistic evidence.

=== Apogee ===
Bakwa was succeeded by her son, Ibrahim (r. 1539-1566) and her younger brother Karama (r.1566-1576). Karama pursued aggressive and expansionist campaigns, with one of Bakwa's daughters, Amina, rising to be the state's most prolific general and warrior. Some traditions have Amina succeeding Karama in 1576, although whether she was queen (sauraniya) is disputed. While she doesn't appear on any regnal lists, local traditions say she ruled the lands she conquered. Amina waged a 34-year campaign against her neighbors, to expand Zazzau territory. According to tradition, she rejected many suitors when younger, and in each town she conquered would behead a man after spending the night with them. Expansion north was blocked by Kano and Katsina, and east by the Jos Plateau; therefore Amina campaigned to the southeast and southwest. She conquered large tracts of land as far as Kwararafa and Nupe, including Bauchi and Yauri. Sokoto caliph Muhammad Bello claimed she reached what presumably was the confluence of the Niger and Benue rivers, and extracted tribute from Katsina and Kano, however contemporary historians dispute the latter claim. The Chronicle of Abuja says Amina received 40 eunuchs and 10,000 kola nuts from Nupe's ruler, introducing these to Hausaland. She is also said to have built earthen walls around many camps and towns, now known as Ganuwar Amina ("Amina's walls"). According to tradition Amina dominated Hausaland for 34 years (until 1610) and died at Attaagar (likely Idah) in battle, with her body not being recovered.

Zazzau was a collection point for slaves to be delivered to the northern markets of Kano and Katsina, where they were exchanged for salt with traders who carried them north of the Sahara. According to the history in the chronicle, Islam was introduced to the kingdom around 1456, but appears to have spread slowly, and pagan rituals continued until the Fulani conquest of 1808. At several times in its history, Zazzau was subject to neighboring states such as Songhai, Bornu and Kwararafa.

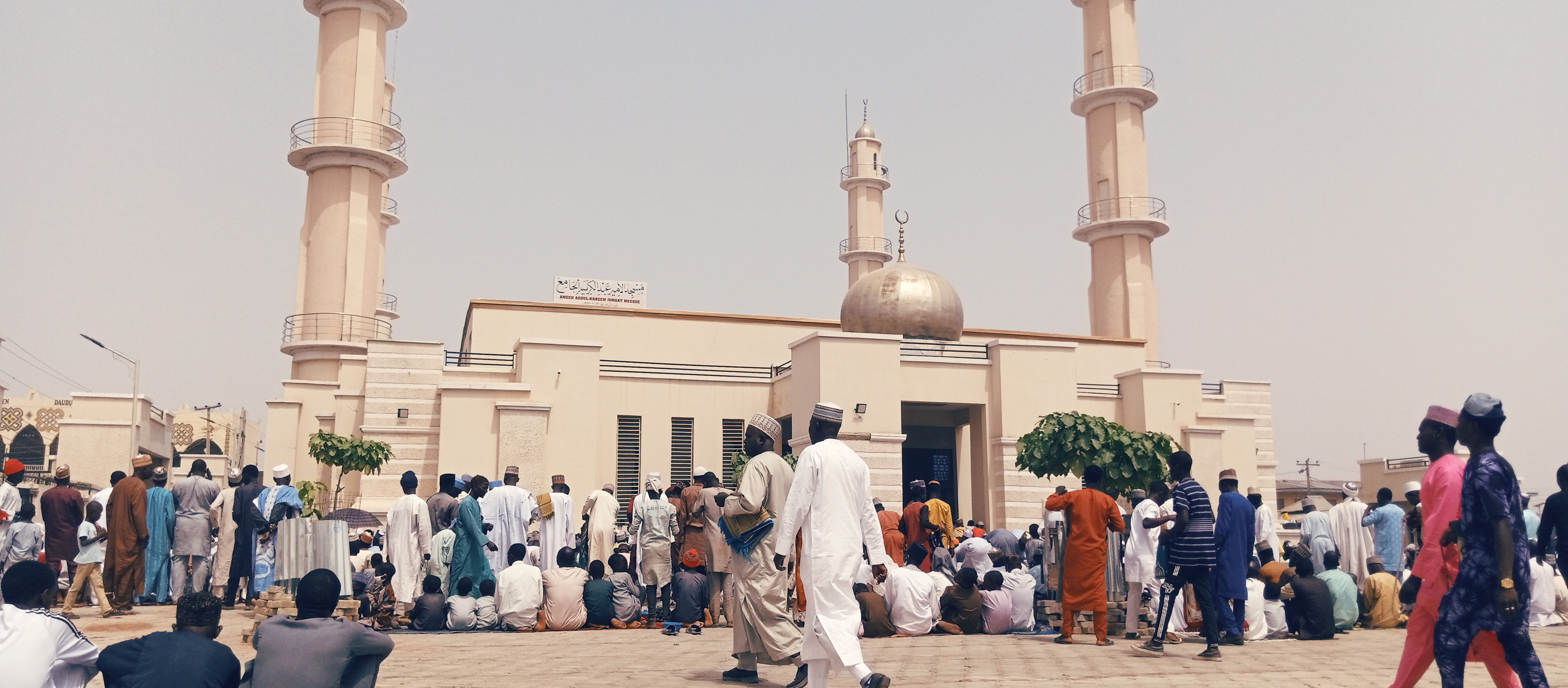
Mosque of the palace

=== Fulani conquest ===
In December 1808 the kingdom was captured in the Fulani jihad. The Hausa (Habe) ruler had escaped to Abuja, where he established a state now known as the Suleja Emirate, retaining his independence and the title of "Sarkin Zazzau". The ruler of the modern Zazzau Emirate also uses the title "Sarkin Zazzau" or "Sarkin Zaria". After the jihad, the culturally similar but pastoral or nomadic Fulani intermarried with the more settled Habe farmers, and the people of the Emirate today are generally known as Hausa–Fulani. The government of the Zaria Emirate differed from other emirates created at this time in that offices were rarely hereditary, but were appointed based on merit or obligation.

== Rulers ==
=== Hausa kingdom ===
Names and Dates taken from John Stewart's African States and Rulers (1989).

Capitals (c. 1010 – c. 1578): Turunku, Wuciciri, Rikoci, Kawar

| Start | End | Ruler |
|---|---|---|
| c. 1010 | ? | Gunguma |
| ? | ? | Matani (or Matazo) |
| ? | ? | Tumso (or Tumsah) |
| ? | ? | Tamusa |
| ? | ? | Sulimano |
| ? | ? | Nasabo (or Maswaza) |
| ? | ? | Danzaki (or Dinzaki) |
| ? | ? | Saiwago (or Nayoga) |
| ? | ? | Kwasari (or Kauchi) |
| ? | ? | Nwaiku (or Nawainchi) |
| ? | ? | Besekal (or Machikai) |
| ? | ? | Kuna (or Kewo) |
| ? | ? | Bashikarr |
| ? | ? | Maji Dadi (or Majidada) |
| ? | ? | Kirari (or Dihirahi) |
| ? | ? | Jenhako (or Jinjiku) |
| ? | 1505 | Sukana |
| 1505 | 1530 | Rabon Bawa (or Monan Abu) |
| 1530 | 1532 | Gudumua Muska (or Gidan Dan Masukanan) |
| 1532 | 1535 | Tukuariki (or Nohir) |
| 1535 | 1536 | Uwan (or Kawanissa) |
| 1536 | 1539 | Bakwa Turunku |
| 1539 | 1566 | Ibrihimu |
| 1566 | 1576 | Karama |
| 1576 | 1578 | Kafow |

List of rulers of Zazzau according to the tradition of Queen Amina:

| Start | End | Ruler |
|---|---|---|
| ? | c. 1535 | Nohir |
| c. 1535 | c. 1536 | Kawanissa |
| c. 1536 | c. 1566 | Bakwa Turunku (female) |
| c. 1566 | c. 1576 | Karama |
| c. 1576 | c. 1610 | Amina (female) |
| c. 1610 | ? | Zaria (female) |

The kingdom's name changed to Zaria at the end of the 16th century.

Capital (c. 1578 – 1835): Zaria (originally founded in 1536 and named after Chief Bakwa's daughter Zaria)

| Start | End | Ruler |
|---|---|---|
| 1578 | 1584 | Ali |
| 1584 | 1597 | Bako Majirua |
| 1597 | 1608 | Bako Su Aliyu |
| 1608 | 1611 | Bako Mahama Gabi (or Gadi) |
| 1611 | 1611 | Bako Hamza (ruled for one day) |
| 1611 | 1618 | Bako Abdu Ashkuku (or Abdaku) |
| 1618 | 1621 | Bako Brima (or Burema) |
| 1621 | 1646 | Bako Ali |
| 1646 | 1647 | Bako Majam Rubu |
| 1647 | 1660 | Bako Brima |
| 1660 | 1670 | Bako Shukunu |
| 1670 | 1678 | Bako Aliyu |
| 1678 | 1682 | Bako Brima Hasko |
| 1682 | 1710 | Bako Mahama Rubo |
| 1710 | 1718 | Bako |
| 1718 | 1727 | Bako Aliyu |
| 1727 | 1736 | Bako Dan Musa |
| 1736 | 1738 | Bako Ishihako (or Ishaq) |
| 1738 | 1750 | Bako Makam Danguma |
| 1750 | 1757 | Bako Ruhawa |
| 1757 | 1758 | Bako Makam Gaba |
| 1758 | 1760 | Bako Mair ari Ashaka Okao |
| 1760 | 1762 | Kao |
| 1762 | 1764 | Bako Bawa |
| 1764 | 1770 | Yonusa |
| 1770 | 1788 | Baba (or Yakuba) |
| 1788 | 1793 | Aliyu |
| 1793 | 1795 | Chikkoku |
| 1795 | 1796 | Mai haman Maigano |
| 1796 | 1802 | Ishihako Jatao (or Ishaq Jatao) |
| 1802 | 1804 | Makkam (or Muhamman Makau) |

=== Independent Fulani rulers ===
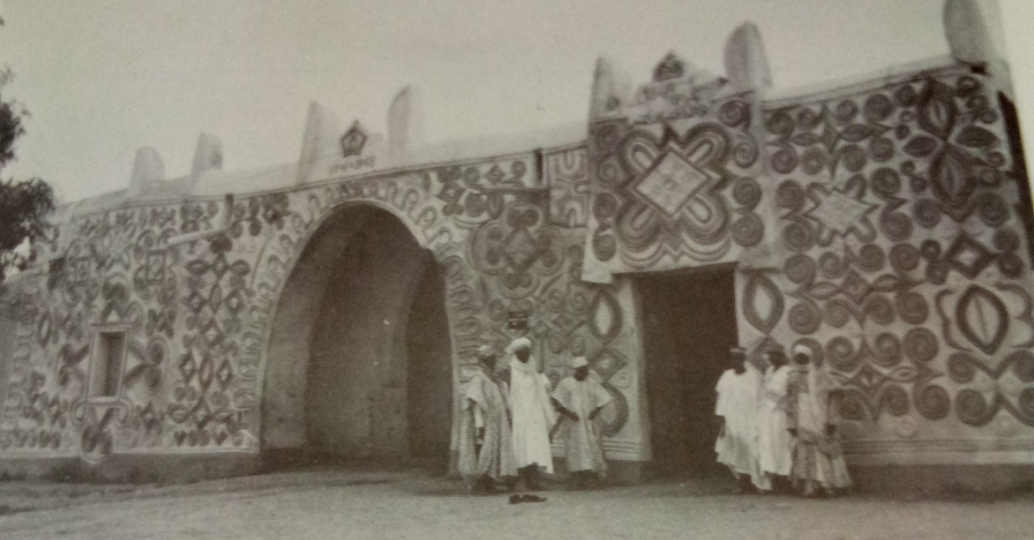
The gate before renovation in 1970

The kingdom was taken over by the Fulani Empire in 1804 and became an emirate in 1835. The Hausa rulers went into exile and founded Abuja. The emirate was taken by the British in 1902.

Rulers of the independent Fulani emirate:

| Start | End | Ruler |
|---|---|---|
| 1804 | 17 May 1821 | Malam Musa ibn Suleiman Ibn Muhammad |
| 1804 | 1825 | Muhamman Makau (Hausa ruler in exile) |
| June 1821 | 1834 | Yamusa ibn Mallam Kilba |
| 1825 | 1828 | Abu Ja (Hausa ruler in exile) |
| 1834 | 18 December 1846 | Abd al-Karim ibn Abbas |
| 6 January 1846 | 28 February 1846 | Hammada ibn Yamusa |
| 15 Apr 1846 | Apr 1853 | Muhammad Sani ibn Yamusa |
| Apr 1853 | Dec 1853 | Sidi `Abd al-Qadir ibn Musa |
| Jan 1854 | 5 Aug 1857 | Abd as-Salam ibn Muhammad Ka'i |
| 21 Sep 1857 | Oct/Nov 1871 | Abd Allah ibn Hammada (1st time) |
| 22 Nov 1871 | Jun/Jul 1874 | Abu Bakr ibn Musa (d. 1873) |
| Aug/Sep 1874 | Nov/Dec 1879 | Abd Allah ibn Hammada (2nd time) |
| 26 Dec 1879 | Jan 1888 | Muhammad Sambo ibn Abd al-Karim |
| Jan 1888 | 13 Feb 1897 | Uthman Yero ibn Abd Allah (d. 1897) |
| 17 Apr 1897 | Mar 1902 | Muhammad Lawal Kwassau ibn Uthman Yero |

=== Colonial period and later rulers ===
Rulers of the independent Fulani emirate:

| Start | end; | Rulers |
|---|---|---|
| March 1903 | 8 April 1903 | Sulayman (regent from 11 Sep 1902) |
| 8 April 1903 | 9 November 1920 | Ali ibn Abd al-Qadir (d. 1924) |
| 1920 | 1924 | Dallatu ibn Uthman Yero |
| 1924 | 1936 | Ibrahim ibn Muhammad Lawal Kwassau (b. c.1886 - d. 1936) |
| 1937 | August 1959 | Malam Jafar ibn Ishaq (b. 1891 - d. 1959) |
| September 1959 | 4 February 1975 | Muhammad al-Amin ibn Uthman (b. 1908 - d. 1975) |
| 8 February 1975 | 20 September 2020 | Shehu Idris (b. 1936 - d. 2020) |
| 7 October 2020 | | Ahmed Nuhu Bamalli (b. 1966) |

== Ruling houses in Zazzau Emirate Council ==
1. Mallawa.
2. Barebari.
3. Katsinawa
4. Sullubawa

== Local governments under Zazzau Emirate Council ==
1. Sabon Gari
2. Giwa
3. Soba
4. Igabi
5. Ikara
6. Makarfi
7. Kubau
8. Kaduna North
9. Kaduna South
10. Kauru
11. Kudan
12. Zaria
