= 1979 Niger State gubernatorial election =

1979 gubernatorial election in Niger State, Nigeria

- July 28, 1979
Nominee	Awwal Ibrahim
Party	NPN
Running mate	Idris Alhassan Kpaki
Governor before election
Joseph Oni
Nigerian military junta
Elected Governor
Awwal Ibrahim
NPN

The 1979 Niger State gubernatorial election occurred on July 28, 1979. NPN's Awwal Ibrahim won election for a first term to become Niger State's first executive governor leading and, defeating main opposition in the contest.

Awwal Ibrahim emerged winner in the NPN gubernatorial primary election. His running mate was Idris Alhassan Kpaki.

== Electoral system ==
The Governor of Niger State is elected using the plurality voting system.

== Results ==
There were five political parties registered by the Federal Electoral Commission (FEDECO) to participate in the election. Malam Awwal Ibrahim of the NPN won the contest by polling the highest votes.

Candidate	Party
Awwal Ibrahim	National Party of Nigeria (NPN)
Great Nigeria People's Party (GNPP)	
Total
Source: Africa Spectrum
