= Queen Amina Statue =

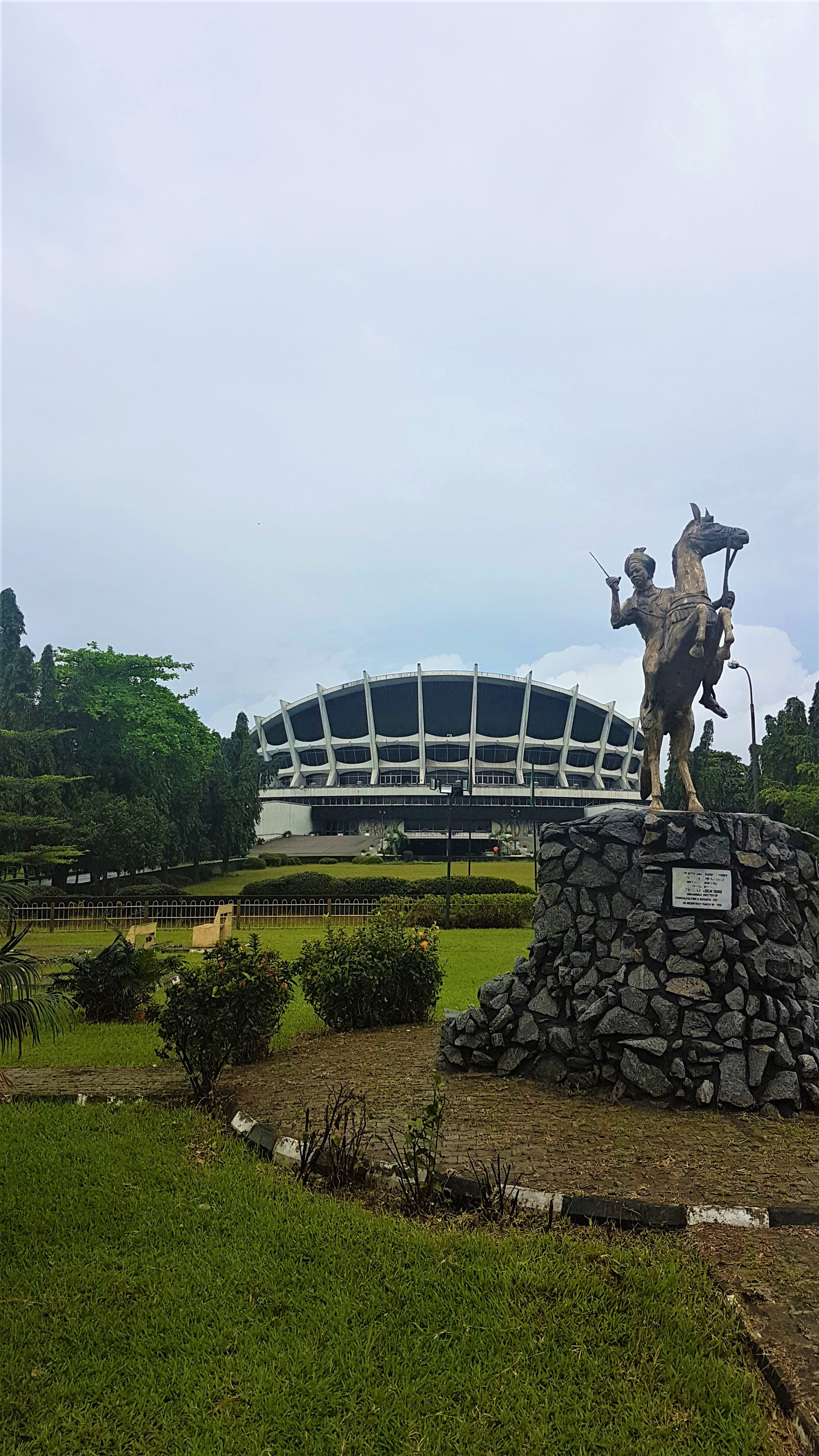
- Queen Amina Statue at the entrance of the National Arts Theatre in Lagos
- Artist: Ben Ekanem
- Year: 1975
- Type: Sculpture
- Medium: Concrete; Bronze
- Condition: Erect
- Location: Lagos, Nigeria

Queen Amina Statue is an equestrian statue in honour of Queen Amina, an Hausa Warrior Queen of Zazzau. The sculpture was originally designed by Ben Ekanem in 1975 during the Second World Black and African Festival of Arts and Culture and was placed at the entrance of the National Arts Theatre in Lagos State. It was destroyed in 2005 due to weathering but was however re-designed in 2014 by an unsigned artist.

== Background ==
Queen Amina was the eldest daughter of Queen Bakwa Turunku, founder of the Zazzau Kingdom. She was a fierce Hausa Warrior Queen of Zazzau who reigned around the early 16th century. She was a fearless warrior. She was born in 1533 and was a trained warrior who was said to have great strength as a man. She was often described as a woman as capable as a man.

The Queen Amina Statue was designed in memory of her bravery and exploits. She ruled for thirty-four years and died in 1610.

== Description ==
Queen Amina Statue is a colossal bronze and concrete sculpture. It shows Queen Amina proudly brandishing her sword while riding on a standing horse.

== Achievements of Queen Amina ==
Queen Amina achieved the following:

- 34 years of the interrupted reign
- Introduction of the metal armor to her army which included the iron helmets and chain mail
- Expansion of her territory to include Nupe, Kano, and Katsina.
- Control of trading routes around the Saharan Region which attracted wealth to her kingdom.
- Domination of regions which include Hausa land, Bauchi Kasachen, and beyond its borders.
- Linking of Egypt to South Sudan from the east and Mali from the north side with trade associates
