= Marok Gandu =

20th-century heroic figure

Marok Gandu of Magata
- Born: Magata, Jei, Atyapland, West Africa (now Magata, Jei, Atyapland, southern Kaduna State, Nigeria)
- Died: 1902; Santswan forest, Atyapland
- Cause of death: Execution by impalement
- Occupations: Soldier; Farmer; Hunter
- Known for: Military commander of the Atyap anti-slave raiding forces

Marok Gandu, also Marock Gandu and Marok Gandu of Magata (18?? - 1902) was a West African anti-slave raiding Atyap war leader who died in defense of his homeland.

Gandu was

"...the leading warrior and the most gallant military commander of the Atyap anti-slavery raiding forces..."

— Toure Kazah-Toure

He was later captured by the Hausa forces led by the last independent king of Zazzau (Zaria), Muhammad Kwassau, during his 1902 raid on the Atyap which had been on since circa 1897. According to British claims, these raids caused the massacre of just over 1,000 Atyap people. These raids came to be known as Tyong Kwasa̱u in Tyap (meaning, "running away from Kwassau"). Gandu hailed from Magata, an important village of the Jei sub-clan of the Agbaat clan, which happens to be the leading military clan of the Atyap. His heroic acts as a legendary commander against external aggression in the history of his people's resistance was thought to have been almost totally neglected. (Note: There has been (perhaps) a deliberate attempt not to keep the heroic figure of Marock and his memory alive among the Atyap people. Partly through the dominant ideological and other influences of the Church both its Catholic and Protestant variants coupled with all the British colonialists did to hide as well as distort Atyap history (in collaboration with the Hausa aristocrats) nothing came to be taught to the later generations about their own past and martyrs like Marok Gandu; and the deeds of Marock should remain sacred on the memory of the Atyap people. Marok paid the highest price on defence of his homeland and its people. : Achi et al. 2019, p. 136)

== Capture and execution ==
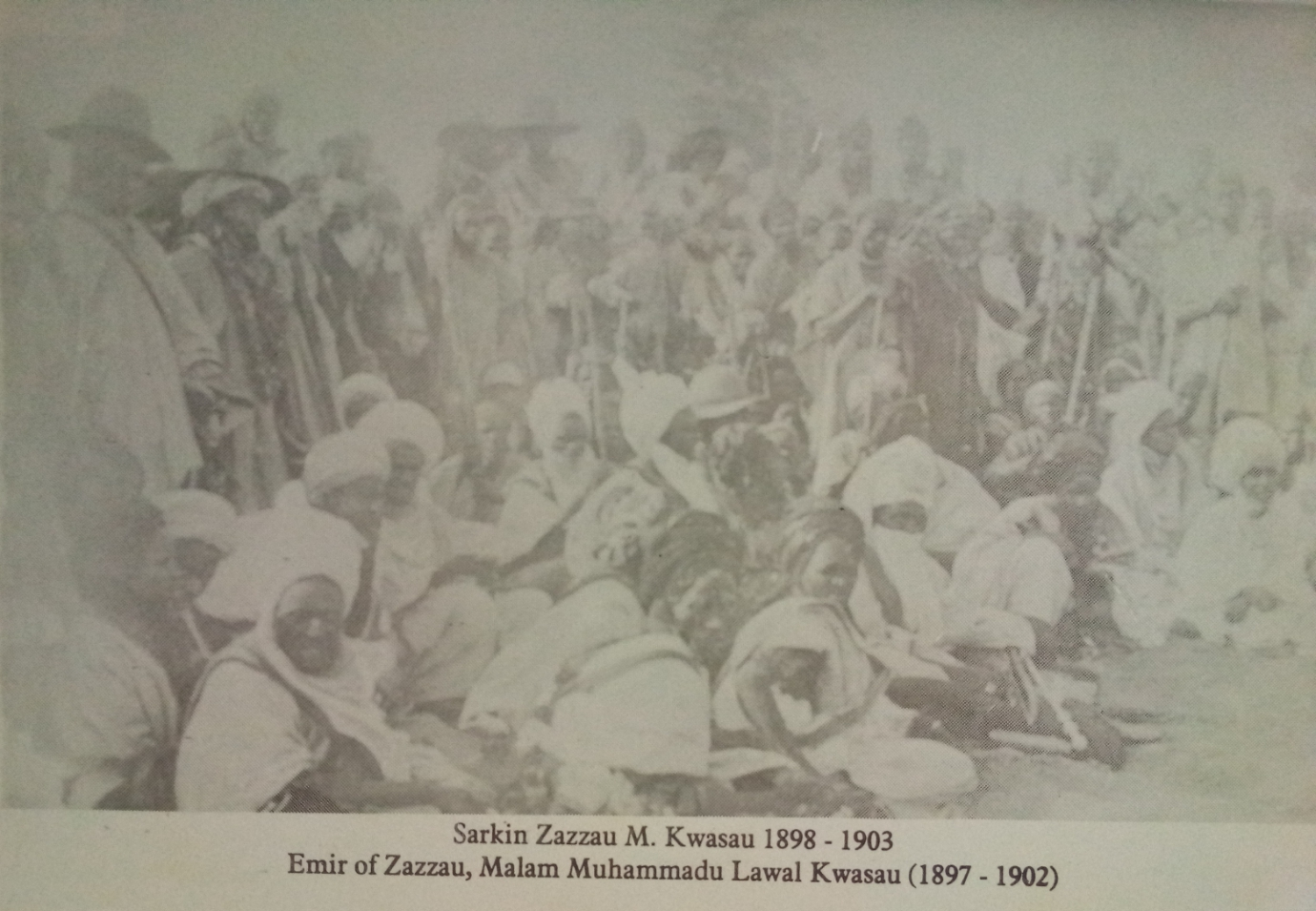
Kwasau and his royal entourage

=== Kazah-Toure's version ===
Gandu was captured in 1902 by the Hausa feudal forces in an ambush while the Atyap staged a fight but could not salvage their leader. He was tortured and later executed by impalement at Santswan forest, Atyapland. (Note: Continuous military attacks by Zazzau and the resultant devastation did not put down the resistance by the Atyap, while they could not repulse the external raids completely. Between circa 1900 and 1902 the leading warrior and commander of the Atyap forces, Marok Gandu, was captured by the Zazzau invaders. This culminated in his capture and execution, by impaling on the stake. A resultant development was the serious weakening of the nerve of the resistance on the eve of British invasion (Kazah-Toure 1995). : Kazah-Toure 2012, p. 92) A spear was then plunged into his heart from his chest. To symbolise mockery, a flowing gown of the Hausa was then worn over his body and a turban round his head. Other Atyap fighters caught by the Kwassau forces were then led to the execution spot and told to behold their chief. It was reported that Kwassau resorted to impaling his captives on stakes, setting others ablaze alive and burying yet others alive, to force the rest of the people into submission. (Note: At Magata, Mayayit, Makarau and Ashong Ash[y]ui, Kwassau met with stiff resistance. He resorted to impaling captives on stakes and burning others alive. Among those said to have been impaled on stakes was Marok of Magata. It was also said that Zinyip Kutunku and Kuntai Mado of Mashan were buried alive. This action was to coerce people into submission. Instead, such insensitivity, and cruelty created a lingering resentment of all that the emirate stood for to the extent that the generation of today still nurse the same resentment. : Achi et al. 2019, p. 92)

=== Ninyio's version ===
Another version presented by Ninyio (2008) from an oral account reveals the capture of Gandu as thus:

"Some Atyab people betrayed him by collaborating with Zazzau slave raiders. Before he was murdered, he was dressed with complete Hausa Sarauta (chieftaincy) regalia i.e. a big gown capped with Jan dara (red cap) and turbaned. In addition, he was given cigarette to smoke with kola nut to chew like a Hausa ruler and he was mocked and addressed "raika shidade Sarkin Katab." This literally means 'long live the king of Katab (Atyab)'."

He was reportedly impaled on a stake after the dramatic mockery. The execution of which led to a great weakening of Atyap resistance against the British on the eve of the colonial invasion.

=== Dauke's versions ===
Dauke (2004:39-49) presented two versions. The first narrated that it was under the last battle between Zazzau and the Atyab which occurred in the same year Lord Lugard reached Zaria in 1902, that the Sarkin Zazzau (Emir of Zazzau), Muhammadu Lawal Kwasau (1897-1902), called the battle of San-Tswuan, in which Kwasau was determined to inflict ultimate damage on the Atyab through brutality and made a treaty with the Chawai people not to aid the Atyab against him, (Note: The last series of wars were with Sarkin Zazzau, Muhammadu Lawal Kwasau, and the Zazzau Emir just at the time of British intervention (1897-1902). These wars are therefore still quite fresh in the minds of the Atyab, having been documented in part. Kwasau was said to be a very aggressive man who wanted by all means to subjugate the area. The last battle between Zazzau and the Atyab took place early in the year that Lord Lugard got to Zaria (1902). This was the battle of San-Tswuan, a place only a short distance east of Zangon Kataf town. The battle had gone so tough that Kwasau not willing to give in made a treaty with the Chawai people. This was so that they would not help the Atyab. And indeed when the Atyab ran out of weapons they thought they would get help from the Chawai, but instead the Chawai drove them back. : Dauke 2004, p. 39.) thereby resorting to the Atyab use of guerilla tactics by hiding in the hills and using of spikes to make things difficult for Kwasau's horsemen, that some Atyab courageous men took the challenge, one of which was Marok Gandu the legend from the Jei sub-clan of the Agbaad clan. Marok fought alongside his group gallantly but due to being outnumbered by Kwasau's army, was captured and executed on a stake which pierced through his bottom right up into his head. He was also said to have requested for a puff of tobacco smoke from a pipe while he fought death on the spear. There were no any other records on the personality of Marok, but there was a Gugwa (horn music) in Atyabland sang in his memory, whose wordings were:

"Marok, wuya ba dadi,"

in Hausa, which translates to

"Marok, torture is indeed unpleasant,"

in English, a song said to draw tears from among the dancers and seldom, the audience.

The second version is considered unpopular. This version is said to have come from unclear sources and does not relate Marok's heroism to Kwasau's wars, but to a theft-related offense he was said to have committed, the result of which he got a public execution to serve as a warning to others. The version also is said to have related Marok's execution to his defiant way, being that, as said here, he stole from the Hausa people which won the hearts of his people, who considered the Hausa as "Zazzau's agents of oppression". Dauke, however, in his investigation discovered that no public execution took place in Zangon Kataf except one which happened between 1925 and 1930, involving two Asholyio (Marwa) men who thought their acts would be applauded were executed during Ja'afaru's reign as District Head in Zangon Kataf town, for robbing a Hausa trader of a horse, at a time when Zazzau slave-raiders still attacked the Atyab seldom. Hence, with the findings of this investigation, Marok's execution was confirmed to have been related to the war with Zazzau, after which Kwasau, assuming to be victorious against the Atyab, returned to Zaria only to meet Lord Lugard awaiting him, who arrested, tried and exiled him for his brutality to Lokoja.

=== Others ===
Yohanna (2004) and Akau (2014) also made mention of his execution, but with a date at variance with the others'.

== Legacy ==
According to Kazah-Toure in Achi et al. (2019), a solemn song was sung in his memory up until the 1940s, all over Atyapland during celebrations and ceremonies, to remember his heroism, fall, brutal execution and the turbulent times of his days, and which ironically was not composed in Tyap, but in Hausa language. The wordings were roughly captured as thus:

Duniya da wuya
Marok duniya ba dadi
Lokacin wuyaba dadi
Marok maza sun fadi
Marok namijin duniya
Duniya wuya ba dadi
Jarumin yaki ya sha azaba
Ranan wuya ba dadi;

in Hausa and translates into:

The world is full of suffering
Marok the world has no sweetness
Times of suffering has no sweetness
Marok heroes have fallen
Marok brave man of the world
[World hardship has no sweetness]
Gallant warrior suffered extreme pains
Day of hardship has no sweetness.
