= 1983 Niger State gubernatorial election =

1983 gubernatorial election in Niger State, Nigeria

- August 13, 1983
Nominee	Awwal Ibrahim
Party	NPN
Elected Governor
Awwal Ibrahim
NPN

The 1983 Niger State gubernatorial election occurred on August 13, 1983. NPN candidate Awwal Ibrahim won the election.

== Results ==
Awwal Ibrahim representing NPN won the election. The election held on August 13, 1983.
