= Amina of Zazzau =

Ruler of Zazzau

Amina
- Sarauniyar Zazzau
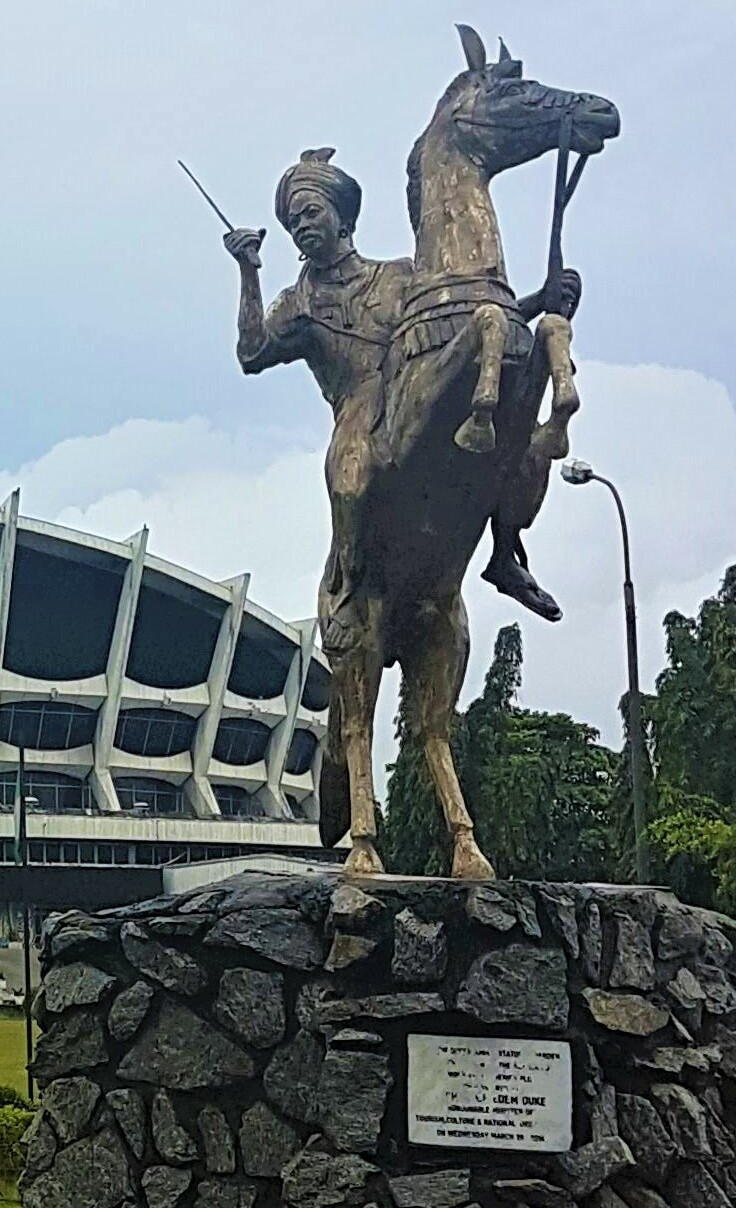
- Queen Amina Statue in Lagos

Sarauniya of Zazzau
- Reign: c. 1576–1610
- Coronation: c. 1576
- Born: 1533; Zazzau
- Died: 1610 (age 77); Zazzau
- House: Zazzau

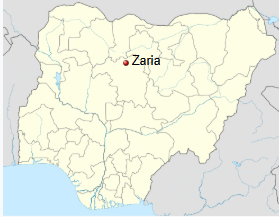
Location of Zaria/Zazzau in modern-day Nigeria

Amina (also Aminatu, born c. 1533; died 1610;) was a Hausa historical figure in the city-state of Zazzau (now Zaria in Kaduna State), in what is now the north-west region of Nigeria. Official/palace tradition has her having reigned as queen (sarauniya), (Note: Sarauniya can also refer more generally to female chiefs and organisational heads.) however other traditions say she was a princess (gimbiya). While her name isn't present on regnal lists found in the Chronicle of Abuja and two published by E. J. Arnett, local traditions say she ruled the territory she conquered. According to some sources, she reigned from 1576–1610.

== Early life ==
Amina was likely born in the middle of the sixteenth century CE. According to the Oxford Encyclopedia, which relies on oral traditions collected by anthropologist David E. Jones, she was the daughter of one King Nikatau and Queen Bakwa Turunku. She was brought up in her grandfather's (Sarkin Nokhir) court and favored by him. He carried her around his compound and instructed her carefully in political and military matters. (r. 1536–c. 1566). (Kaduna State).

However, Nikatau is entirely absent from all primary Hausa chronicles and early colonial fieldwork. In the foundational king-lists—compiled by Arnett—Bakwa Turunku is invariably identified not as a queen mother, but as a male king (Sarkin Zazzau) who ruled in his own right. The name Bakwa itself might derive from baƙo (lit. "guest" in Hausa), pointing to a foreign founder who established the royal seat at Turunku.

By Jones' account, at age 16, Amina was named Magajiya (heir apparent) and given forty female slaves (kuyanga). From an early age, Amina had a number of suitors attempt to marry her. Attempts to gain her hand included "a daily offer of ten slaves" from Makama and "fifty male slaves and fifty female slaves as well as fifty bags of white and blue cloth" from the Sarkin Kano.

After the death of her parents in or around 1566, Amina's brother became king of Zazzau. At this point, Amina had distinguished herself as a "leading warrior in her brother's cavalry" and gained notoriety for her military skills. She is still celebrated today in traditional Hausa praise songs as "Amina daughter of Nikatau, a woman as capable as a man that was able to lead men to war."

== Expansion and dominance ==
After the death of her brother Karama in 1576, some traditions hold Amina ascended to the position of queen. Zazzau was one of the original seven Hausa States (Hausa Bakwai), the others being Daura, Kano, Gobir, Katsina, Rano, and Garun Gabas. Before Amina assumed the throne, Zazzau was one of the largest of these states. It was also the primary source of slaves that would be sold at the slave markets of Kano and Katsina by Arab merchants.

Only three months after being crowned queen, Amina waged a 34-year campaign against her neighbors, to expand Zazzau territory. Expansion north was blocked by Kano and Katsina, and east by the Jos Plateau; therefore she campaigned to the southeast and southwest. Her army, consisting of 20,000 foot soldiers and 1,000 cavalry troops, was well trained and fearsome. In fact, one of her first announcements to her people was a call for them to "resharpen their weapons." She conquered large tracts of land as far as Kwararafa and Nupe, including Bauchi and Yauri. Sokoto caliph Muhammad Bello claimed she reached what presumably was the confluence of the Niger and Benue rivers, and extracted tribute from Katsina and Kano, however contemporary historians dispute the latter claim. The Chronicle of Abuja says she received 40 eunuchs and 10,000 kola nuts from Nupe's ruler, introducing these to Hausaland.

Legends cited by Sidney John Hogben say that she took a new lover in every town she went through, each of whom was said to meet the same unfortunate fate in the morning: "her brief bridegroom was beheaded so that none should live to tell the tale." Under Amina, Zazzau controlled more territory than ever before. To mark and protect her new lands, Amina had her cities surrounded by earthen walls. These walls became commonplace across the nation until the British conquest of Zazzau in 1904, and many of them survive today, known as ganuwar Amina (Amina's walls).

== Death ==
The exact circumstances of Amina's death are not known. The nineteenth-century Muslim scholar Dan Tafa says that "She died in a place called Attaagar. It was for this reason that the kingdom of Zazzau was the most extensive among the kingdoms of Hausa, since Bauchi included many regions." Drawing on Tafa's account, Sidney John Hogben reports that "Amina died in Atagara, near present day Idah, for at that time Amina had pushed the frontiers of Zazzau south of the Niger-Benue confluence. But there are many contradictions surrounding her death; many authors in their books cited that she died in Vom Jos while other historians said she died in Atagara, the present day Idah." The Oxford Dictionary of African Biography says that according to tradition she dominated Hausaland for 34 years and died at Attaagar (likely Idah) in battle, with her body not being recovered.

According to one account, Amina was succeeded by her sister Zaria.

== Legacy ==
As the British historian Michael Crowder has noted, after Amina's death

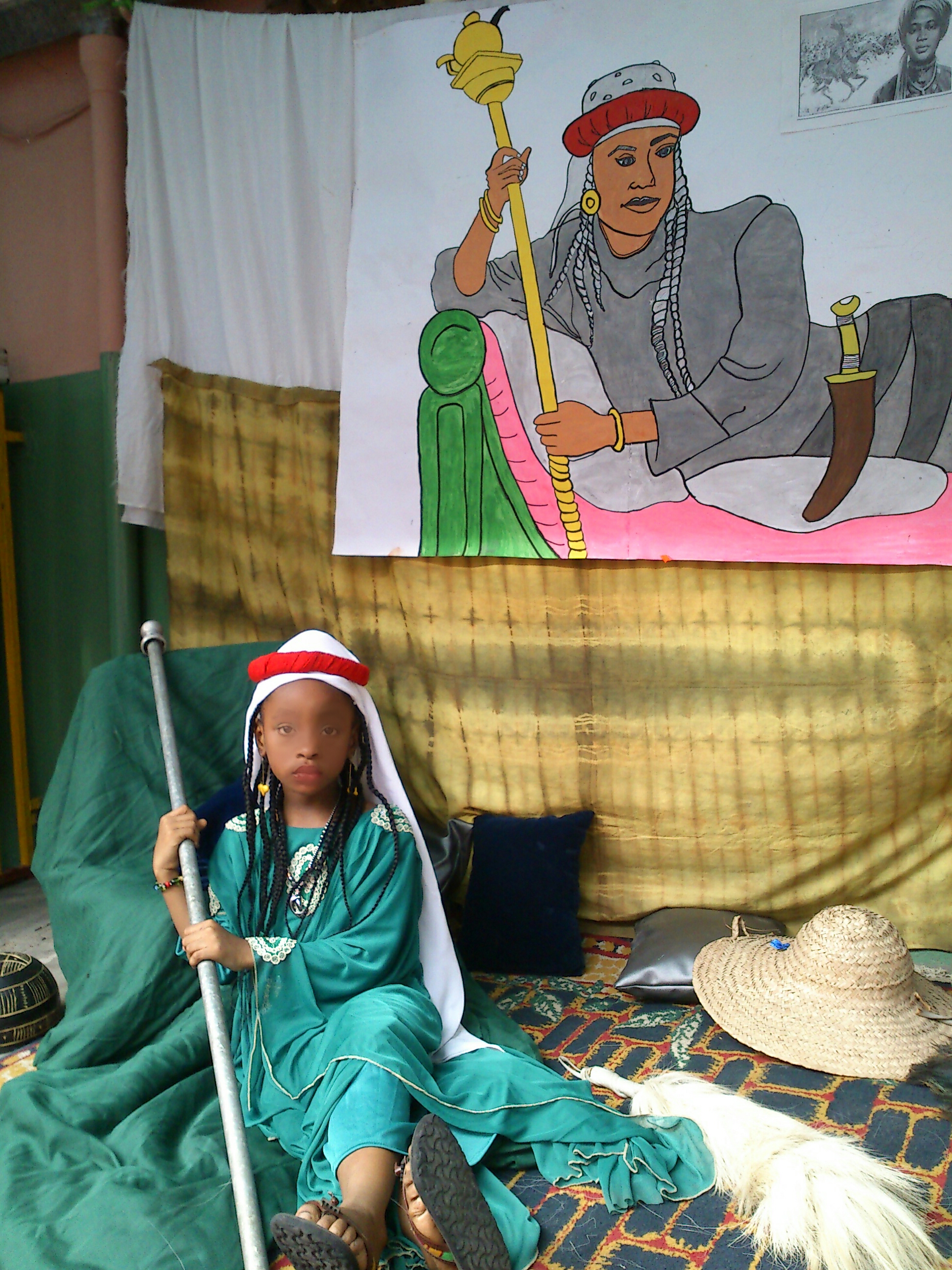
An actress depicting Queen Amina in a stage production

...ruling class Hausa women experienced a steady diminution in their influence and were systematically deprived of their authority and autonomy. The traditional titles and offices relating to authority over women and redress of their grievances have now become nominal or may have been discarded all together.

Although Amina's success as a ruler did not have a trickle down effect on her female successors, Amina enjoyed a lasting reputation, bordering on legend, as a woman warrior. In his 1812 work Infaq al-Maysur, Sultan Bello of Sokoto wrote:

Strange things have happened in the history of the seven Hausa States, and most strange of these is the extent of the possessions which God gave to Aminatu, daughter of the ruler of Zazzau. She waged war in the Hausa lands and took them all so that the men of Katsina and the men of Kano brought her tribute. She made war in Bauchi and against the other towns of the south and of the west, so that her possession stretched down to the shores of the sea [i.e. the Niger].

Beyond her expansion of Zazzau territory, she created trade routes throughout Northern Africa. Additionally, Amina has been credited with ordering the construction of a distinctive series of ancient Hausa fortifications, known as 'Amina's walls', and with introducing kola nut cultivation in the area.

== Historical references ==
One of the earliest textual sources to mention Amina is Muhammed Bello's history Ifaq al-Maysur, composed around 1836. He claims that she was "the first to establish government among [the Hausa]," and she forced Katsina, Kano and other regions to pay tribute to her. Bello provided no chronological details about her. She is also mentioned in the Kano Chronicle, a well-regarded and detailed history of the city of Kano, composed in the late nineteenth century, but incorporating earlier documentary material. According to this chronicle, she was a contemporary of Muhammad Dauda, who ruled from 1421 to 1438, and Amina conquered as far as Nupe and Kwarafa, collected tribute from far and wide and ruled for 34 years. A number of scholars accept this information and date her reign to the early to mid-fifteenth century.

There is also a local chronicle of Zaria itself, written largely in the nineteenth century but extending to 1902, published in 1910, that gives a list of the rulers and the duration of their reigns. Amina is not mentioned in this chronicle, but oral tradition in the early twentieth century held her to be the daughter of Bakwa Turunku, whose reign is dated by the chronicle from 1492 to 1522. On this basis, some scholars date her reign to the early sixteenth century. Historian Abdullahi Smith, however, places her reign after 1576.

== Modern cultural depictions ==
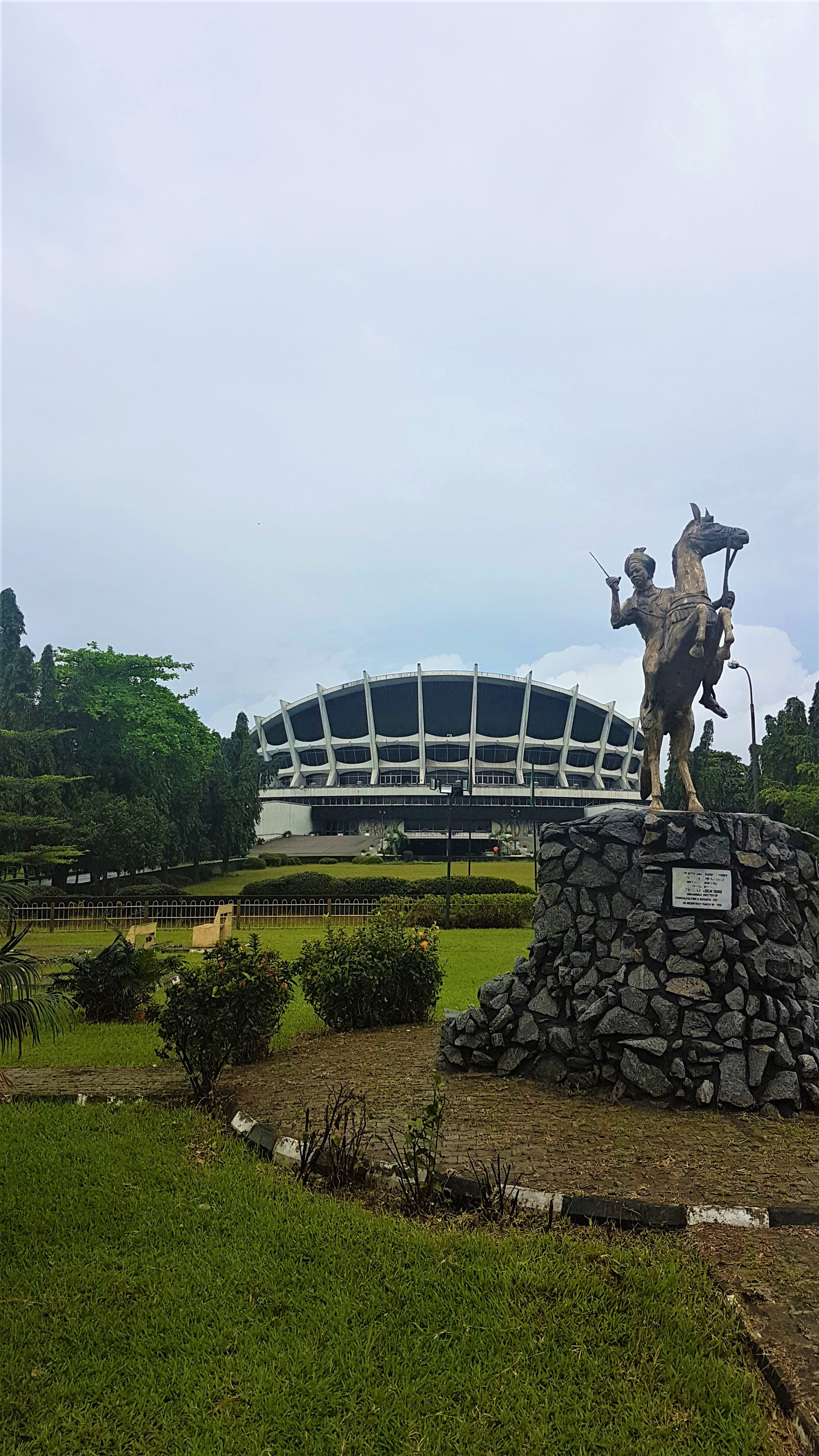
The Queen Amina Statue at the National Arts Theatre in Lagos State

- The Queen Amina Statue at the National Arts Theatre in Lagos State honors her, and multiple educational institutions bear her name.
- Amina is the protagonist of the historical fantasy novel Queen of Zazzau (2018) by J.S. Emuakpor, based on her life beginning in 1557 CE.
- Amina is the inspiration for the character Malika in the graphic novel Malika: Warrior Queen (2017) by Roye Okupe as stated in the coloring book also created by the author.
- In Education, the fifth episode of the Small Axe films by Steve McQueen, 12-year-old Kingsley Smith triumphantly reads aloud the story of Amina to his family, after having learnt to read.
- In the video game Age of Empires III: Definitive Edition Queen Amina appears as the leader of the Hausa civilization.
- Amina appears as the leader of Zazzau in 1444, well before her lifetime, in Europa Universalis IV. She is also a general, which female rulers typically cannot be in the game, and has very good stats.
- The 2021 film Amina depicts her rise to the throne. It is directed by Izu Ojukwu.
- Amina appeared as a Great General in the video game Civilization VI and a playable leader in Civilization VII.

More recent oral tradition has a series of lively stories about the queen, and these have found their way into popular culture. Among them were: Amina was a fierce warrior and loved fighting. As a child, her grandmother Marka, the favorite wife of her grandfather Sarkin Nohir, once caught her holding a dagger. Amina holding the dagger did not shock Marka, rather it was that Amina held it exactly as a warrior would. As an adult, she refused to marry for the fear of losing power. She helped Zazzau (Zaria) become the center of trade and to gain more land. Her mother, Bakwa, died when Amina was 36 years old, leaving her to rule over Zaria.

== See also ==
- History of Africa
- Nigeria
