= Sadiq Zazzabi =

Nigerian hausa artist

- Born: Abubakar Usman; 13 August 1983 (age 43); Gwale, Kano, Nigeria
- Education: National Diploma
- Alma mater: Federal College of Education Kano
- Occupations: Singer, songwriter
- Years active: 1997–present
- Known for: Best known for is song "Zazzabi"

Abubakar Usman (born 13 August 1983) also known as Sadiq Zazzabi is a Nigerian Hausa language singer, and songwriter. He became popular with his hit song Yanzu Abuja Tayi Tsaf. He won first place at Ga Fili Ga Mai Doki organized by Bayero University Kano.

== Early life and background ==
Sadiq Zazzabi was born in Ayagi quarters, Gwale LGA, Kano State. He attended Warure Special Primary School in 1995, moved to Adamu Nama’aji Junior Secondary School, and obtained his senior secondary certificate (SSCE) from Shekar-Barde Secondary School in 2002. He acquired a National Diploma in Environmental Studies and Survey from Federal College of Education, Kano.

== Career ==
While growing up, Sadiq Zazzabi always liked singing. He began by writing Islamic Songs for the Islamic School he attended. Sadiq started writing songs since 1997. The first song he wrote was 'Yar Gidan Ma’aiki (1997), followed by Shugaban Halitta Sayyadil Kaunu (1997), Annabi Ne Madogara (1999). He joined Kannywood in 2002. He gained recognition for his song Zazzabi which later become his stage name Sadiq Zazzabi in Kawa Zuci album (2005). He gained more exposure following the release of Yanzu Abuja Tayi Tsaf (2008).

Sadiq has written over 1000 songs which made him popular among hausa speakers across the country and beyond. His songs are based on love, politics and social issues among which includes Fyade (Rape) in which he addressed and enlightened the public on the danger of the menace of rape, and Babban Sarkin which he sang for the Emir of Zazzau Shehu Idris. He was arrested for the song Maza Bayan ka (All Men Behind You) in 2017.

== Controversies ==
In March 2017, Sadiq was arrested and sued by Kano State Censors’ Board (KSCB) because of the song Maza Bayan Ka (All Men Behind You), in which he expresses open support for former governor of Kano State Rabiu Musa Kwankwaso, a bitter political rival of the incumbent governor Abdullahi Umar Ganduje. Sadiq claimed his arrest was Political, and a few days later, he was released on bail.

== Discography ==
=== Albums ===
Year	Title	Album
2005
2005	Zazzabi yazo	Kawa Zucci
2005	Zazzabi remix	Kawa Zucci
2005	Kawazuci	Kawa Zucci
2005	Wadatarzuci	Kawa Zucci
2005	Aure	Kawa Zucci
2005	Sauyin yanayi	Kawa Zucci
2007	Ya Rasulillah	Hanyar Tsira
2007	Tawassuli	Hanyar Tsira
2007	Tabarakta	Hanyar Tsira
2007	Batula	Hanyar Tsira
2007	Bulaliya (An Watsa Martabar Aure)	Hanyar Tsira
2008	Yanzu Abuja Tayi Tsaf	Abuja Tayi Tsaf
2008	Gaba Gaba Dai	Abuja Tayi Tsaf
2008	Mai Farin Hali	Abuja Tayi Tsaf
2008	Allah Yaja Da Ran Gwani Na	Abuja Tayi Tsaf
2008	Mai Adon Gaskiya	Abuja Tayi Tsaf
2008	Baza Su Iya Da Kai Ba	Abuja Tayi Tsaf
2011	Mun Ji Dadi Yobe	Yobe Tayi Tsaf
2011	Mun Bi Gaskiya	Yobe Tayi Tsaf
2011	Yobe Tayi Tsaf	Yobe Tayi Tsaf
2007	Hajiya Amina	Garkywar Mata
2007	Dashen Allah mai Hali abin koyo	Garkywar Mata
2007	Sannu Babbar Giwa	Garkywar Mata
2007	Kayi Mun Gani	Kayi Mun Gani
2007	Baza Mu Dau Guba Ba	Kayi Mun Gani
2007	Taka Gwamna Muje	Kayi Mun Gani
2007	Jama’ar Kaduna	Kayi Mun Gani
2007	Zo Ka Zarce	Kayi Mun Gani

=== Singles ===
Title	Year
Yar Gidan Ma’aiki	1997
Shugaban Halitta Sayyadil Kaunu	1997
Annabi Ne Madogara	1999
Fatima and Zahra	2003
Aikata Alkhairi	2003
Muji Tsoron Allah	2004
Ilimi Hasken Rayuwa	2004
Zazzabi	2005
Auren Soyayya	2008
Yanzu Abuja Tayi Tsaf	2008
Adabiya Na Gano	2009
Gidan Biki	2009
Yar Sarki Hajiya Bilkisu	2009
Biki Leshi	2010
Biki Budiri	2010
Jami’ar Bayero	2010
Hanyar Tsira	2010
Zazzabi Nake	2010
Dashen Allah Amina	2011
Babban Gida Zamu Zaba	2011
Bakandamiya Amina	2012
Bikin Aure Mun Kazao Nuratu	2012
Juna Biyu	2012
Garkuwar Mata	2012
Namadi Sambo	2013
Wanda Ya So Ka	2013
Sardaunan Jama’a	2013
Auren Gaskiya	2013
Amira	2013
Amarya Safiya	2013
Daga Kanki An Gama Hajiya Sa’adatu	2013
Uban Maza	2013
Ka Iya Ka Huta	2014
Ali Akilu Sai Kai	2014
Ba Guda Baja Da Baya	2015
Nafisa Amarya	2015
Hassana Amarya	2015
Kayi Mun Gani	2015
Abinci Wani Gubar Wani	2015
Garkuwan Talakawa	2016
Dan Malikin Kano	2016
Allah Maganin Maciji	2016
Atiku Ba Gudu Ba Karya	2016
Amira Amarya Ce	2017
Muna Murna Hajiya Aisha Talatu	2017
Maza Bayan ka (All Men Behind You)	2017
Sardaunan Dole	2017
Dawo Dawo Dan Makama	2018
Babban Sarki	2018
Kai Ka Dai Gayya remix	2018
Mukhtar Ramalan Ka Dawo	2018
Dan Majen Zazzau	2018
Chanji Muke So	2018
Katsinawa Mu Zabi Lado	2018
Atiku Muke Fata Nigeria	2019
Ke Ya gano Yake So	2019
Zainab Makama	2019
Kwarya Tabi Kwarya	2019
Barsu Da Kansu	2019
Bujimi Na Mijin Guza	2019
Fyade (Rape)	2020
Dashen Allah	2020
