= Jatau (given name) =

- Gender: Male
- Language: Hausa

Origin
- Origin: Nigerian
- Meaning: fair-coloured, light
- Region of origin: North-West, Nigeria

Jatau is a Nigerian male given name and surname of Hausa origin. The name "Jatau" means "fair-coloured, light".

== Notable individuals with the name ==
- Auwal Jatau (born 1955), Nigerian politician
- Manasseh Daniel Jatau (born 1955), Nigerian politician
- Peter Yariyok Jatau (1931 – 2020), Nigerian Roman Catholic archbishop.
- Abu Ja (1851), Nigeria ruler, founder of the Emirate of Abuja.
