= Muhammadu Aminu =

17th Emir of Zazzau from 1959 to 1975

Emir of Zazzau
- Reign: September 1959 – 4 February 1975
- Predecessor: Ja'afaru dan Ishiyaku
- Successor: Shehu Idris
- Born: 1908
- Died: 4 February 1975 (aged 66–67)
- House: Katsinawa House

Muhammadu Aminu was the 17th Emir of Zazzau and Chairman of Zazzau Emirate Council. He was succeeded by Alhaji Shehu Idris on February 8, 1975 following his demise.

Aminu was selected by the council of kingmakers to succeed Ja'afaru Dan Isyaku, he was from the Katsinawa lineage of the ruling houses in Zaria which were four houses in number: Barebari, Katsinawa, Sullubawa and Mallawa. Prior to his appointment as emir, he was district head of Sabon Gari Local government area.

== Coronation ==
Aminu's coronation took place outside the palace of Sarkin Zazzau in 1959. The day's order of ceremony began with the governor's inspection of a guard of honor composed of police personnel from the Zaria native Authority. Thereafter, Ahmadu Bello and the colonial resident received the governor and proceeded to their designated seat to await the new emir. The new emir arrived at outside the palace accompanied by a group of dogarais, he was administered the oath of office by the Chief Imam of Zaria and presented the staff of office by the Governor of Northern Nigeria. The ceremony ended with various district heads paying homage to the new amir
