= Mayanka Waterfalls =

Waterfall in Nigeria

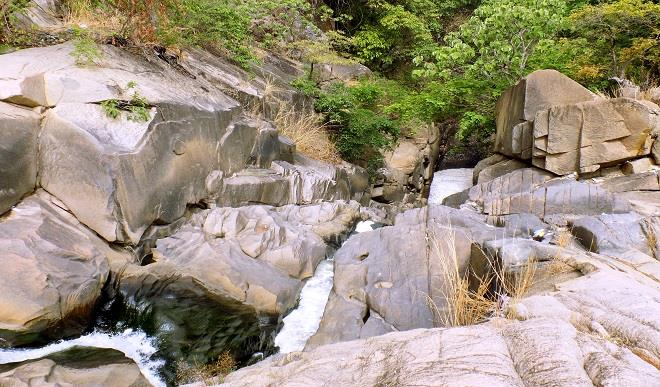

- Location within Nigeria
- Location: Suleja, Niger State, Nigeria
- Coordinates: 9°10′12″N 7°10′13″E
- Type: Segmented
- Total height: 30 m (98 ft)
- Watercourse: 200 m (656 ft)

Mayanka falls is located at the outskirts of Suleja, Nigeria. Its name Mayanka means 'infamy' or 'fearfulness' in the Hausa language.

== History ==
Mayanka, typically means slaughter of animals for human consumption, is the Hausa word for slaughter house, slaughter slab or any slaughter spot. The Mayanka of Suleja, down the falls of the Iku River, was the place for the slaughter (execution) of criminals sentenced in pre-colonial times to death by the traditional authorities of the domain.

Every Nigerian society had its system of administering justice as part of its comprehensive system of government, from time immemorial until the advent of colonialism, with regard to what is conceived as civil and criminal offenses according to its traditional norms and values.

Shehu Uthman Danfodio-led jihadists sacked the Zage-zagi from their ancestral territory (headquartered in Zaria) in the 19th century, from where they moved south to the present location to find another Zazzau territory.

According to the source, therefore, any Fulani man or woman sighted in the domain in those days would be treated as a jihadist spy and would be arrested and brought as a criminal before the Sarkin Zazzau Royal Court, to be summarily sentenced to death by the sword of the Mayanka Hauni.

== Tourism ==
The most famous visitors at the falls include: hikers, lovers of nature, lovers of fun, explorers, researchers. The impression of a non-definite route up the hill is an impression that will certainly remain in the mind for a very long time. The loveliness of the falls is a must-see. Some stuff to go along with before going to Mayanka Falls; hiking boots, water bottle, sun screen, face cap.
