= Kabir Tukura Ibrahim =

Nigerian politician (born 1984)

Representative for Zuru/Fakai/Danko-Wasagu/Sakaba Federal Constituency, Kebbi State
- Incumbent
- Assumed office 13 June 2019
- Preceded by: Aliyu Danladi

Personal details
- Born: 15 February 1984 (age 42) Kaduna State, Nigeria
- Party: All Progressives Congress (APC)
- Education: Usmanu Danfodiyo University, Sokoto
- Occupation: Politician
- Website: http://www.kabirtukura.com

Kabir Tukura Ibrahim (born 15 February 1984) is a politician in Nigeria. He is currently a legislator representing the Zuru/Fakai/Danko-Wasagu/Sakaba Federal Constituency of Kebbi State at the Federal House of Representatives in Nigerian 9th National Assembly. He hails from Zuru in Kebbi State of Nigeria.

== Early life and education ==
Kabir Ibrahim Tukura was born in Kaduna State to Alhaji Ibrahim Tukura and Hajiya Salamatu Tukura. In 1994, he obtained his First School Leaving Certificate from the Federal Staff College, Sokoto. This saw him proceed to Federal Government College, Birnin Yauri in Kebbi State where he obtained Senior Secondary Certificate in the year 2000. Upon completion of his secondary education, he would later advanced his education at Usmanu Danfodiyo University, Sokoto, graduating with a Bachelor of Arts in English Language in 2005.

== Early career ==
Following the successful completion of his National Youth Service Corps in 2006, Kabir Ibrahim Tukura was retained by the Federal Radio Corporation of Nigeria where he served as a result of his diligence to work. In October 2009, his next career leap saw him join the Economic and Financial Crimes Commission (EFCC). He later served as an official of the Nigerian Intelligence and Financial Crimes Unit from 2014 to 2016.

== Political career ==
Kabir Ibrahim Tukura's capacity for leadership began to manifest from a young age. In his final year at Usmanu Danfodiyo University, he served as the President of Modern European Languages, Literary and Linguistics Students Association.

Having amassed his wealth of experiences in leadership and civil service terrain, his political exploits on a national scale began with his election as a member of the Federal House of Representatives in 2019.

While in the House of Representatives, Kabir Ibrahim Tukura's age and the quality of his representation brought him to the limelight in 2019 when he was elected as the chairman of the Young Parliamentarian's Forum (YPF). Young Parliamentarian Forum which consists of federal and state lawmakers (Senators, House of Representatives and State Houses of Assembly elected members) who are 45 years and below is a forum for promoting the representation and participation of young people in parliament and wider political processes.

== Strides in politics ==
Kabir Ibrahim Tukura's legislative focus includes constituent issues and matters of national policy. His platform emphasizes youth advocacy, political awareness, and women's empowerment, alongside the implementation of the Sustainable Development Goals (SDGs). In his legislative capacity, he has addressed the reform of Nigerian financial crime laws, focusing on the efficiency of the existing legal framework.

Kabir has a key interest in advancing the frontiers of democratic tenets in Nigeria, evidenced by his antagonism of Hate Speech Bill and the Social Media Bill.

The footprints of Kabir Ibrahim Tukura's representation in his constituency are littered in the litany of his interventions as well as his sponsored bills.

Paramount amongst these is the key role he played in lobbying and influencing the approval of the rehabilitation of the outstanding section of Gadan Zaima – Zuru – Gamji Road. The attendant economic impact in relation to the free flow of movement (human, goods and services) culminated in the jubilation that trailed its approval in his constituency.

Aside provision of solar street lights to illuminate the darkness in selected areas of his constituency, he embarked on the repairs of several boreholes while providing motorised boreholes in Zuru, Fakai, Sakaba and Danko/Wasagu areas of his constituency.

Fathoming the proportion of importance that education enjoys, Kabir made his mark in this sector which includes the provision of a block of 3 classrooms each in Matseri, Zodi, Ribah and Sakaba. He also launched the Kabiru Tukura JAMB/University Scholarship Scheme that procures JAMB registration forms for students in his constituency as well as sponsorship of successful candidates who are hardworking and desirous of pursuing higher learning. To mark his 100 days in office, he commemorated the International Day of the Girl Child by distributing sanitary pads and back–to–school materials for 4000 girls within his constituency.

In healthcare, Kabir Ibrahim Tukura has sponsored several medical trips that are necessary for survival in his scorecard. In addition, he has provided tricycles to the Joint National Association of Persons Living with Disabilities in his constituency

Kabir Ibrahim Tukura's sponsored bills include:

1. HB 1091, Federal Medical Centre Zuru (Est) 2020

2. HB 1443, Federal Medical Centre Zuru Establishment 2021

3. HB 1089, Economic and Financial Crimes Commission Act (Amendment) Bill 2020

4. HB 1090, Money Laundering (Prohibition) Act (Amendment) Bill 2020

5. HB 777, National Youth Development Commission Bill 2020

== See also ==
- List of Hausa people
