= Muhammad Kwassau =

Last independent ruler of Zazzau

Muhammad Kwassau was the last independent ruler of Zazzau prior to its incorporation into the British Empire. After attaining rule in 1897 by being elected, though under threat of armed conflict, he welcomed the British in 1900, and invited them more fully in 1901 to fight Kontagora raids, However, he was deposed by them in 1902, marking the end of Zazzau's independence.

== See also ==
- Marok Gandu
