= Nuhu Bamalli =

Nigerian politician

Minister of External Affairs
- In office 1 December 1965 – 17 January 1966
- Prime Minister: Tafawa Balewa
- Preceded by: Jaja Wachuku
- Succeeded by: Okoi Arikpo

Minister of State for External Affairs
- In office 1961–1965
- Prime Minister: Tafawa Balewa
- Minister: Jaja Wachuku

Member of the Federal Senate from the Northern Region
- In office 1960–1966

Member of the Federal House of Representatives
- In office 1954–1959
- Constituency: Zaria Central
- Succeeded by: Saidu Zango

Personal details
- Born: 1917 Zaria, Colonial Nigeria
- Died: February 25, 2001 (aged 83–84)
- Party: National Party of Nigeria (1978–1984)
- Other political affiliations: Northern People's Congress (1948–1966)
- Children: Ahmed; Mansur
- Education: Barewa College
- Occupation: politician; diplomat; writer

Malam Nuhu Bamalli CFR (1917 – 25 February 2001) served as the first Minister of State in the Ministry of Foreign Affairs between the 1st October, 1960 to 1965, Minister of Foreign Affairs of Nigeria 1965 to 15 January 1966. Until his death he held the position of Magajin Garin Zazzau, second most senior Prince in Zazzau Emirate between 1961 and 2001, died on 25 February 2001.

== Biography ==
He was a member of the Mallawa royal house of Zaria, as implied by his last name, 'Bamalli' (the singular of Mallawa is Bamalle).

Bamalli was a founding member of Jam’iyyar Mutanen Arewa, the political organisation that later became the Northern People's Congress (NPC). He was elected to the Federal House of Representatives in 1954. In 1960, he was appointed by the Northern Regional Government to the Federal Senate.

Bamalli subsequently served in the cabinet of Prime Minister Tafawa Balewa as Minister of State for External Affairs from 1961 to 1965, and as Minister of External Affairs from 1965 until the end of the First Republic in 1966. During his tenure, he led the Nigerian delegation to the United Nations debate on the status of Northern Cameroons.

Nuhu Bamalli Polytechnic Zaria in Nigeria was named after him. It opened in February 1989.

He attended Katsina Higher College (BAREWA) 1931 to 1935, a father to two top Diplomats who served as Ambassadors in Thailand, Morocco and Myanmar Republics, the two sons are;

1. H.E Amb. Ahmed Nuhu Bamalli, CFR served as Nigerian Ambassador to the Kingdom of Thailand with concurrent accreditation to the Republic of the union of Myanmar, and now he is the current Emir of Zazzau, Kaduna State.

2. Late. Amb. Mansur Nuhu Bamalli, he served as the Nigerian Ambassador to Morocco.

Nuhu Bamalli CFR, was the leader of the delegation to the United Nations on the issue of Northern Cameroon (Sardauna Province).

He was also the chairman of the movement for creation of Present Kaduna State between 1967 and 1987.

Political offices
Preceded by Jaja Wachuku	Foreign Minister of Nigeria; 1965 – 1966	Succeeded by Yakubu Gowon
