= Bakwa Turunku =

22nd ruler of Zazzau (fl. 1500s)

Bakwa Turunku (fl. 1500s) was the twenty-second ruler of Zazzau. Little is known with certainty about Bakwa's life, and traditions differ regarding their origins and gender. Some accounts describe Bakwa as the daughter of Sarkin Zazzau Nohir, while others suggest they were a stranger who rose to power in Turunku. Described as a ruler "whose main interest was merriment," Bakwa's reign was noted for its peace. They are credited with establishing the city of Zaria, which they named after their daughter. Bakwa's eldest daughter was Amina, who later became the kingdom's most celebrated figure. Bakwa remains highly revered. The palace of the rulers of Zazzau is still called gidan Bakwa ("Bakwa’s house"), and their burial place is regarded as a site of pilgrimage.

== Life ==
One of the gates of gidan Bakwa, palace of Sarkin Zazzau (ruler of Zazzau) in 1962

Much of the information on Bakwa Turunku's life is uncertain, particularly with regard to their gender. Historian Sa'ad Abubakar believes Bakwa was a woman, who likely reigned as the first sarauniya (queen) of Zazzau. According to a local tradition, the name "Bakwa Turunku" may mean "the stranger belonging to the Toronke people" (from Toro in Tekrur). Another maintains that they were the daughter of Nohir, the twentieth ruler of Zazzau.

Before the 16th century, the people of Zazzau had lived in various separate settlements, with the walled towns of Kufena and Turunku eventually dominating the region. It is not clear which of the two served as the capital of Zazzau. According to various kinglists, Bakwa's entry is the first to indicate a capital, listed as "Bakwa of Turunku". Abdullahi Smith argues that Bakwa's succession overshadowed the pre-existing dynasty of Kufena. Sa'ad Abubakar expanded on this, suggesting that before their ascension Bakwa was an official of the kings of Kufena "holding the title of Sarauniya with Turunku as her fief." According to another tradition, both cities operated independently until Bakwa, ruler of Turunku, seized power in Kufena.

Around 1535, Sarkin Zazzau Nohir died and was succeeded by his brother Kawanissa, who reigned for a year before his death. After an interregnum, Bakwa became sarki, either by election or by seizing the office. In accordance with Zazzau custom, Bakwa's eldest daughter Amina assumed the title of Magajiya at the age of sixteen and was gifted forty female slaves. Due to the limited water supply in Turunku, Bakwa established a new capital, Zaria, named after their second daughter.

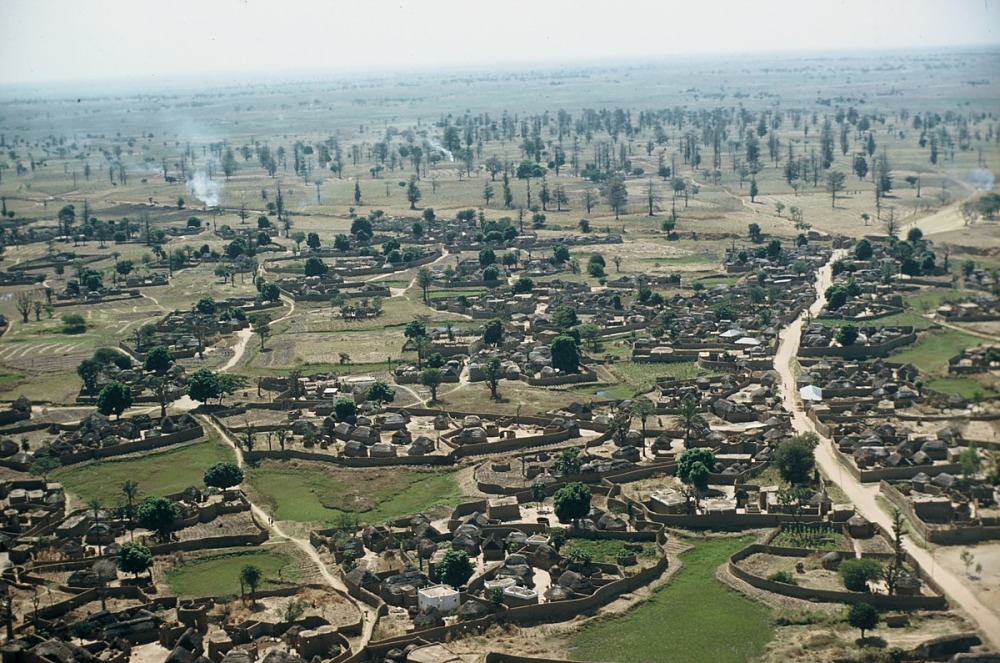
Aerial view of the outskirts of Zaria (1959)

Throughout the 16th century, beginning with Bakwa's reign, Zazzau underwent significant changes, extending its authority beyond the Kaduna River as far as the upper Gurara valley. Apart from a failed invasion from the south by Kwararafa, Bakwa's reign was generally peaceful. Tradition says that "quivers were covered by spider’s web while swords and arrows had gone rusty because of long disuse." Bakwa was said to have built a spacious room called Kigo in the palace, where women were summoned daily to perform the gada dance, accompanied by kalangu (talking drum) players.

The length of Bakwa's reign is uncertain. The chronicle Daura Makas Sariki (compiled by E J Arnett in 1910) states that they reigned for thirty years, while the king list published in the Gazetteer of Zaria Province (1920) gives Bakwa's reign as only three years (1536–1539). Sa'ad Abubakar suggests Bakwa, after ruling for thirty years, died around 1566.

The palace of the rulers of Zazzau is still known as gidan Bakwa (Bakwa's house) today. Bakwa's place of burial remains an object of pilgrimage.
