= Aminu Ala =

Nigerian musician and writer (born 1973)

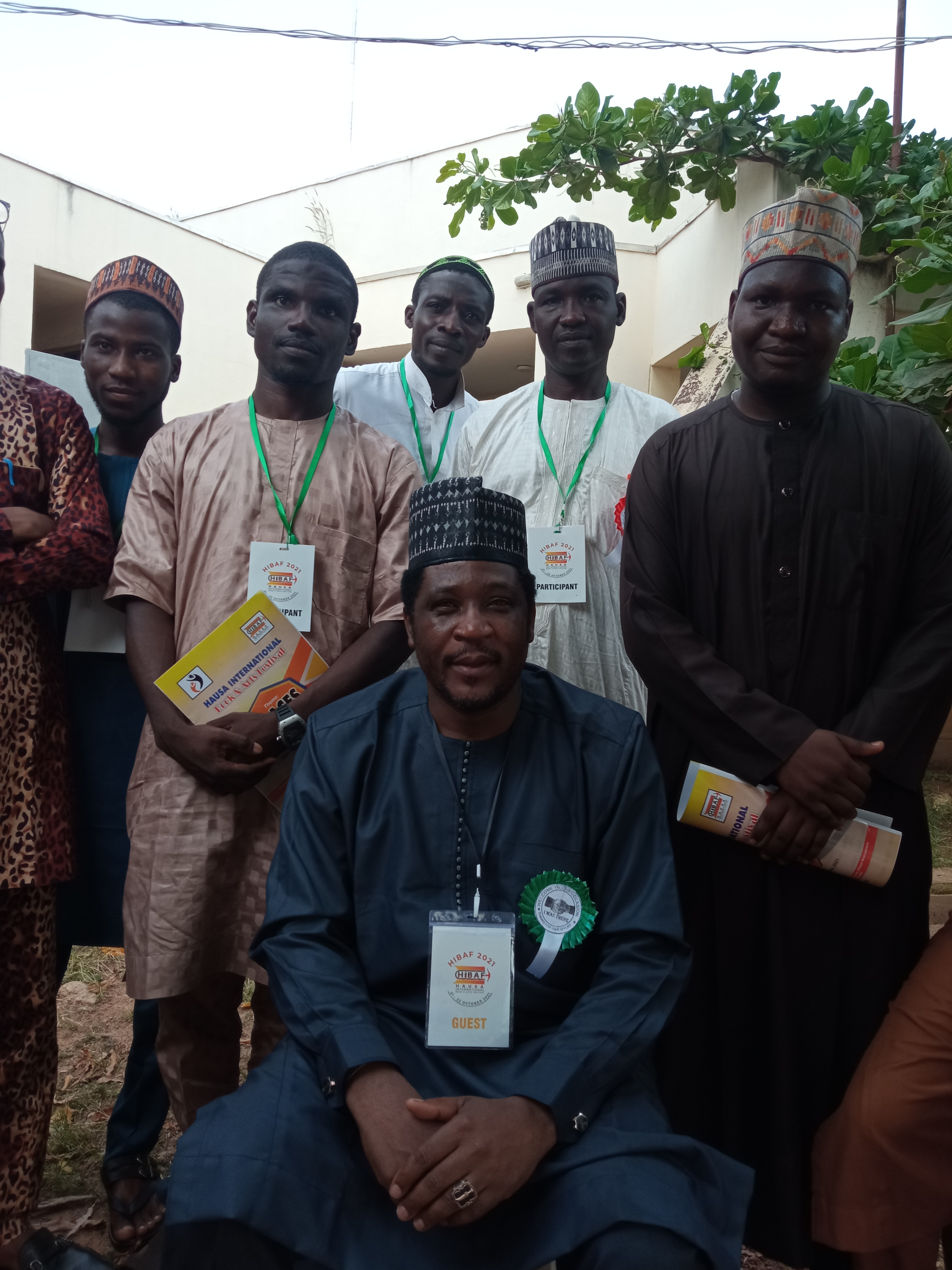
- Aminu Ladan Ala with friends at HIBAF 2021

Background information
- Born: 11 February 1973 (age 53); Kano state
- Occupations: Musician and writer

Aminu Ladan Abubakar, also known as Alan Waka (born 11 February 1973), is a Nigerian Hausa-language musician and writer from Kano State, Northern Nigeria.

== Early life and education ==
Aminu Ala completed his primary education at Tudun Murtala Primary School between 1980 and 1986, then GSS Kawaji Secondary School in Dakata, Kano from 1987 to 1992 in 2004. He continued his education at the School of Technology and in Kano where he received his diploma 2007.

== Publications ==
Ala was first known in the field of Hausa language writing before he became known in the field of music. Ala has authored nearly nine books including,

- Cin Zarafi
- Bakar Aniya
- Sawaba
- Cin Fuska
- Jirwaye
- Tarzoma

== Musics ==
Ala started singing when he was a student at an Islamic school which used poetry and songs to educate.
