= Abu Ja =

Emir of Abuja from 1825 to 1851

- Sarkin Zazzau

Emir of Abuja
- Reign: 29 March 1825 – 1 August 1851
- Predecessor: position established (Makau as de jure Sarkin Zazzau)
- Successor: Abu Kwaka
- Born: Jatau dan Ishaku Jatau; Zaria, Zazzau
- Died: 1 August 1851; Abuja, Abuja Emirate
- Issue: Ibrahim Iyalai: Musa Angulu; Koko
- Father: Ishaku Jatau

Abu Ja (born Jatau dan Ishaku Jatau; died 1851) was the founder of the Emirate of Abuja.

== Early life ==
Abu Ja was born to Ishaku Jatau, the ruler of the Hausa state of Zazzau. His mother died shortly after giving birth to him, and he was raised by his father's first wife, Tasalla, as her own child, alongside her other sons, Makau and Abu Kwaka. His birth name was Jatau, but he was nicknamed Abu Ja ('Abu the Red') due to his light skin. He was described as being five feet six inches tall.

== Flight from Zazzau ==
In 1804, the jihad of Usman dan Fodio reached Zazzau after a Fulani Islamic scholar, Malam Musa, who owed allegiance to Usman, conquered Zaria. As a result, Makau, the last Hausa ruler of the state, was forced to seek refuge in the southwest among his former vassals, the Koro. Abu Ja, along with three thousand people, followed Makau to the Koro town of Zuba. From this war camp, they defended against the newly established Emirate of Zaria.

In 1825, Makau, now well established in Zuba, led an expedition against the powerful Fulani town of Lapai. However, his soldiers, resentful after he forbade them from slave-raiding on a previous campaign, deserted him in the middle of the battle. Recognising his desperate situation, Makau called his brother, Abu Ja, and named him as his successor. He was then killed in battle at the gates of Lapai.

== Reign ==
Abu Ja spent the first three years of his reign in Izom among the Gbagyi people. He then decided to build a city further away from Lapai. In 1828, at the foot of the Abuchi hills, he built his house, and a year later, he began constructing defensive walls around the new town, which he named after himself. This new town quickly gained importance due to the influence it exerted over the neighboring peoples. Amongst Abu Ja's symbols of office was a quiver containing two hundred poisoned arrows made for him by the people of Burum.

Light of Skin,
Lord and Master of the Walled Town
And in the open field the first to draw Blood.

— A praise song of Abu Ja

Some years after the completion of the walls of Abuja, the Emir of Zazzau, Mamman Sani, set out on an expedition and camped outside the town. However, after holding talks with Abu Ja, he gathered his army and left, declaring that he had only set out to fight pagans, not the people of Abuja. Although Abu Ja managed to avoid an invasion from Zazzau, he grew increasingly paranoid. He banned all traders and strangers from entering the town or its vicinity. Any Fulani found in the area was killed on suspicion. On one occasion, he killed several Fulani pastoralists and their cattle, numbering about three thousand.

In 1851, a combined force from Nassarawa and Kontagora, both owing allegiance to the Sokoto Caliphate, waged war on the people of Toto. Abu Ja sent some of his men, including his sons, to aid Toto. During the fighting, three of Abu Ja's sons were captured by the Emir of Nassarawa, Makama Dogo. Umaru Nagwamatse, a Sokoto prince and the Emir of Kontagora, threatened to abandon the war if Abu Ja's sons were not released. His threat was ignored, and Makama Dogo killed all three of them. Abu Ja died not long after their killing on 1 August 1851.
