= Bako Motors =

Tunisian car manufacturer

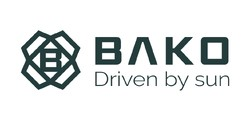
- Industry: Automotive
- Founded: 2021; 5 years ago
- Headquarters: Luxembourg (registered)
- Production output: 100
- Owner: Boubaker Siala (founder and CEO)
- Number of employees: 42 (in Tunisia)
- Website: bakomotors.com/en/home

Bako Motors is a Tunisian startup electric car manufacturer, founded in 2021 and based in Tunis, Tunisia.
Company headquarters are registered in Luxembourg. Production facilities are in Ben Arous/Tunisia and Riyadh/Saudi-Arabia. Founder and CEO is Boubaker Siala; COO is Khaled Habaieb. Bako's small vehicles are -mostly- intended for the African market. The cars are far cheaper than comparable electric mini-cars from e.g. the US.

Bako Motors began making three-wheeled cargo vehicles in 2021 (such as the Bako B1 tricycle), but has since moved to four-wheeled models. Currently the firm produces two different models. The B-Van, which can carry 400 kilograms (882 pounds) of cargo and has a 100 to 300-kilometer (62 to 186 mile) range, is designed for logistics and last-mile delivery. The other is the Bee, a tiny 2-seat car with a 70 to 120-kilometer (44 to 75 mile) range and a max speed of 45 kilometers per hour (27 mph). It's tailored toward daily, in-city trips. A third model, the X-Van, is on the drafting board ^{(as of January 2026)}; it will fit two passengers and have a larger cargo area.

Bako's vehicles have solar panels on their roofs. While they also still have lithium batteries and can be plugged in and charged at home or on the road, the solar panels give them free access to one of Africa's greatest natural resources — sunshine.
So far, the company has made just 100 vehicles but it plans to scale up and increase exports in 2027.

== See also ==
- List of automobile manufacturers
- Economy of Tunisia
