= Suleja =

City in Niger state

- LGA and city
- Interactive map of Suleja
- Location within Nigeria
- Coordinates: 9°10′33″N 7°10′49″E
- Country: Nigeria
- State: Niger State

Government
  - Local Government Chairman and the Head of the Local Government Council: Isyaku Bawa Na’ibi
  - Emir: Awwal Ibrahim

Area
  - Total: 114.6 km^{2} (44.2 sq mi)

Population (2022)
  - Total: 368,900
  - Density: 3,219/km^{2} (8,337/sq mi)
- Time zone: UTC+1 (WAT)
- Climate: Aw

Suleja is a city and Local Government Area in Niger State, Nigeria, just north of Abuja, capital of the country. It is sometimes confused with the nearby city of Abuja, due to its proximity and the fact that it was originally named Abuja before the Nigerian government adopted the name from the then Emir Sulayman Bal for its new federal capital in 1976.

Suleja was established in the early 19th century by Mohammed Makau, the last Hausa emir of Zaria, and his followers, who were fleeing the Fulani jihadists engaged in the conquest of northern Nigeria. Zaria, or Zazzau, was one of the Hausa city/states of Northern Nigeria which were being conquered by the Fulani jihadists under its leader, Usman bin Fodio.

Suleja is the location of the Ladi Kwali Pottery Centre, established by Michael Cardew in 1950. The leading exponent of this school of pottery was Dr. Ladi Kwali, whose works are displayed internationally.

== Economy ==
Discoveries of ancient sculptures of the Nok culture, both at Suleja town and in the Makabolo River bed, have helped prove the influence of Nok on the Yoruba art of Ife. Today Suleja exports Gbari pottery. Cotton weaving and dyeing, with locally grown indigo, and mat making are traditional activities, but farming remains the chief occupation. Local trade is primarily in agricultural products. In addition to the Pottery Centre, a government secondary school and a hospital are located in the town. The Dorben Polytechnic has a campus in Suleja. In August 2025, the federal executive council of Nigeria approved the establishment of JEFAP UNIVERSITY through the national universities commission, the first university in the suleja emirates.

== Climate ==
The rainy season in Suleja is humid, stifling, and overcast, whereas the dry season is hot and partially cloudy. Throughout the year, temperature normally ranges from 16 °C (60 °F) to 34 °C (93 °F), with temperatures rarely falling below 13 °C (55 °F) or rising over 38 °C (100 °F).

From January 28 to April 14, the hot season, with an average daily high temperature exceeding 33 °C (91 °F), lasts for 2.5 months. Suleja experiences its warmest weather in March, with an average high temperature of 34 °C (93 °F) and low temperature of 22 °C (71 °F).

From June 23 to October 2, the cool season, which has an average daily high temperature below 28 °C (83 °F), lasts for 3.4 months. With an average low of 16 °C (61 °F) and high of 31 °C (88 °F), December is the coldest month of the year in Suleja.

The amount of time that the sky is overcast or largely overcast increases from 55% to 65% throughout the winter in Suleja, which experiences increasing cloud cover. On January 1, there is a 41% probability of gloomy or mainly cloudy weather.

January 1, with clear, mostly clear, or partly overcast circumstances 59% of the time, is the clearest day of the winter.

For comparison, the likelihood of gloomy or largely cloudy weather on May 13, the cloudiest day of the year, is 86%, while the likelihood of clear, mostly clear, or partly cloudy skies on January 1, the clearest day of the year, is 59%.

== History ==
The emirate's wooded savanna area of about 2,980 square kilometres (1,150 sq mi) originally included four small Koro chiefdoms that paid tribute to the Hausa kingdom of Zazzau. After warriors of the Fulani jihad (struggle/War) captured Zaria (Zazzau's capital, 220 km (140 mi) north-northeast) about 1804, Muhamman Makau, sarkin ("king of") Zazzau, led many of the Hausa nobility to the Koro town of Zuba (10 km or 6 mi south). Abu Ja (Jatau), his brother and successor as sarkin Zazzau, founded Abuja town in 1828, began construction of its wall a year later, and proclaimed himself the first Sarkin Abuja.

Withstanding Zaria attacks, the Abuja emirate remained an independent Hausa refuge. Trade with the Fulani emirates of Bida (to the west) and Zaria began in Emir Abu Kwaka's reign (1851–1877), but, when Abuja's leaders disrupted the trade route between Lokoja (160 km or 99 mi south-southeast) and Zaria in 1902, the British occupied the town. Alluvial tin mining began in Emir Musa Angulu's reign (1917–1944).

In 2011, Suleja was hit by several bomb assaults. Ten people were killed on March 3. On April 7, another bomb killed 25 people.

On January 18, 2025, a fuel tanker carrying roughly 60,000 litres of petrol overturned at the Dikko junction near Suleja, where after crashing local residents gathered to collect spilled fuel. The fuel promptly caused an explosion which killed over 100 people and injured another 69, including at least 52 critically.

== See also ==
- Boko Haram
- Mayanka Falls
