= Shehu Idris =

Emir of Zazzau and teacher

Shehu Idris CFR
- Emir of Zazzau
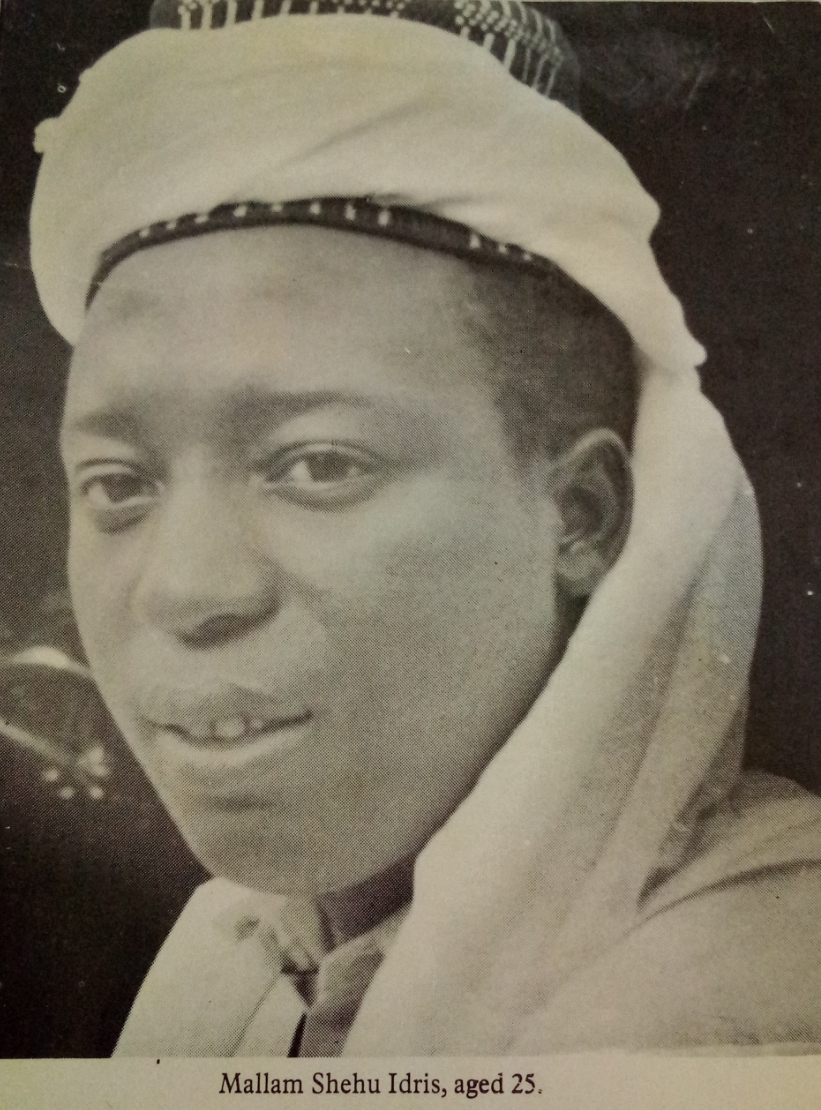

Emir of Zazzau
- Reign: 1975–2020
- Coronation: 8 February 1975
- Predecessor: Muhammadu Aminu
- Successor: Ahmed Nuhu Bamalli
- Born: 20 February 1936; Zaria, Kaduna State, Nigeria
- Died: 20 September 2020 (aged 84); Kaduna, Kaduna State, Nigeria
- Burial: Zaria, Kaduna State
- House: Katsinawa
- Father: Idrisu Auta
- Mother: Aminatu Idrisu
- Religion: Islam
- Occupation: Teacher

Shehu Idris (20 February 1936 – 20 September 2020) was a Nigerian teacher who served as the 18th Emir of Zazzau, a Nigerian traditional state headquartered in Zaria. He also served as chairman of Zazzau Emirate Council and Kaduna State Council of Chiefs. A member of the Fula people, he ascended the throne on 8 February 1975 following the death of Alhaji Muhammadu Aminu, his predecessor. Idris was the longest reigning monarch in the history of the Zazzau emirate, having reigned for 45 years from 1975 to 2020. He was succeeded by Ahmed Nuhu Bamalli as the 19th Emir of Zazzau.

== Early life and education ==
Shehu Idris was born to the family of Mai unguwa Idrisu Auta, a ward head of Unguwar Rimin Tsiwa which is a ward between Unguwar Durumi and Kuyanbana in Zazzau Emirate, his father was sometimes called Autan Sambo while his mother was called Hajiya Aminatu. His father, Mai unguwa Idris was nicknamed Auta because he was the last born of the Emir of Zazzau Muhammadu Sambo who reigned from c. 1879 to 1888, Emir Muhammadu Sambo was the second child of Emir of Zazzau Abdulkarimi who reigned from c.1834–1846, as such his father was a Ward Head while his Grandfather and Great-Grandfather were Emirs in Zazzau Emirate

Idris started his education being tutored by two Islamic scholars in Zaria and then continued with formal studies at the Zaria Elementary School. He was at the elementary school from 1947 to 1950, during which period he lost his father at the age of 12. Idris continued both his qur’anic and formal education and enrolled in the Zaria Middle School in 1950 and finished studies in 1955. He then attended Katsina Training College to become a teacher.

== Later life and career ==
In 1958, he was a teacher at a school in Hunkuyi and then taught at a few other schools in Zaria. In the 1960s, he was a private secretary to the late Emir of Zazzau Muhammadu Aminu, and was also appointed as the secretary to the Zaria Native Authority council in 1965. In 1973, he was bestowed the title of Dan Madamin Zazzau and was appointed the district head of Zaria.

Idris succeeded Emir Aminu after his death in 1975. On 10 January 2015 he celebrated the 40th anniversary of his coronation, and on 8 February 2020, he celebrated the 45th anniversary of his coronation.

== Death ==
Idris died around 11:00 am GMT+1 on 20 September 2020, at the 44 Nigerian Army Reference hospital in Kaduna.
