= Ahmed Nuhu Bamalli =

Emir of Zazzau

- Emir of Zazzau
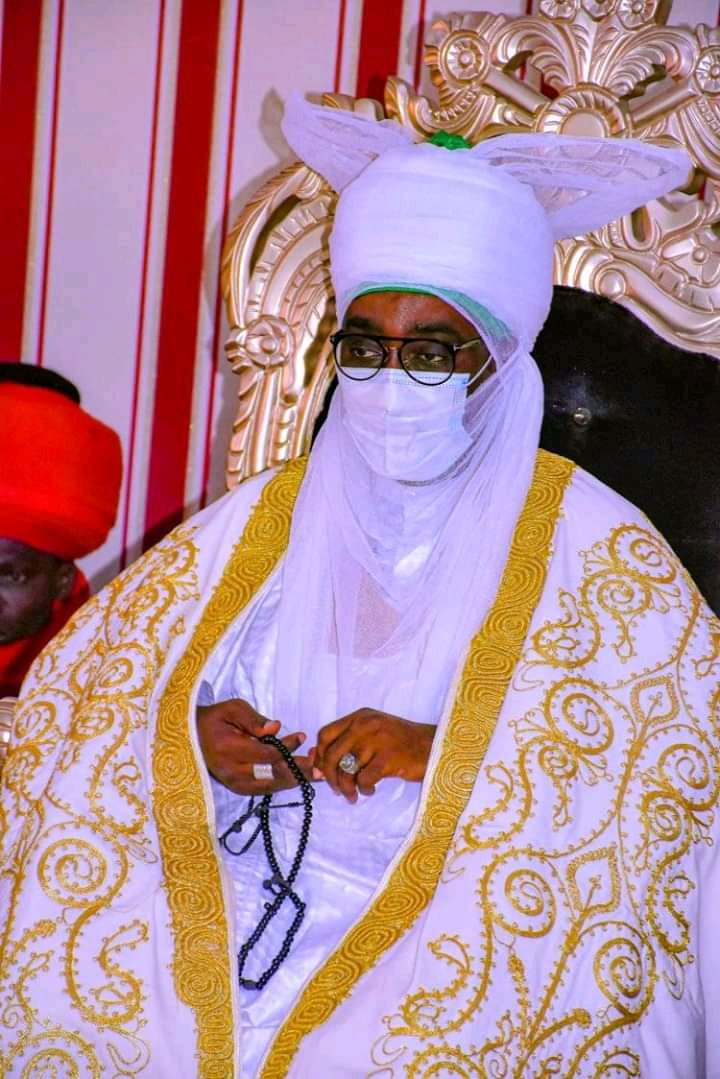

Emir of Zazzau
- Reign: 7 October 2020 – present
- Coronation: 9 November 2020
- Predecessor: Shehu Idris
- Born: 8 June 1966 (age 60); Zaria
- House: Mallawa
- Father: Nuhu Bamalli
- Religion: Islam
- Occupation: Diplomat

Nigeria's Ambassador to Thailand
- In office November 2017 – 2020
- President: Muhammadu Buhari
- Preceded by: Chudi Okafor
- Succeeded by: Oma Djebah

Nigeria's Ambassador to Myanmar
- In office November 2017 – 2020
- President: Muhammadu Buhari
- Preceded by: Chudi Okafor
- Succeeded by: Oma Djebah

Ahmed Nuhu Bamalli CFR (born 8 June 1966) is a Nigerian lawyer, banker and diplomat. He is the former Nigerian ambassador to Thailand with concurrent accreditation to Myanmar, and the current 19th Fulani Emir of Zazzau, a Nigerian traditional state with headquarters in Zaria, Kaduna State, Nigeria. He is the first Emir from the Mallawa ruling house to be enthroned in a century after the dethronement of his grandfather, Emir Alu Dan Sidi in 1920. He has a grandchild, Prince Khalid-Nabeel Bamalli who is the second son of the current Durbin Zazzau Mallam Mohammed Aminu Aliyu Bamalli.

== Early life and education ==
Bamalli was born in Kwarbai Zaria, Kaduna State, Nigeria. He is the second son of Nuhu Bamalli (who once served as Nigeria's Minister of Foreign Affairs). He obtained (LLB) law degree in 1989 from at Ahmadu Bello University, and his master's degree in international affairs and diplomacy from the same university in 2002. He obtained a post graduate diploma in management from the Enugu State University of Science and Technology in 1998. He also attended a fellowship on conflict resolution at the University of York in 2009 and completed a diploma in organizational leadership from the University of Oxford in 2015. He also completed the General Management Program (GMP) at Harvard Business School in 2011.

== Career ==
Bamalli worked for the Metropolitan Management Agency before becoming head of human resources at Mtel, the mobile communication arm of the old Nigerian Telecommunications Limited.

He also worked in banking and as executive director and later acting managing director of the Nigerian Security Printing and Minting Company Limited.

He was permanent commissioner in the Kaduna State Independent Electoral Commission in 2015. Until his appointment as the new emir of Zazzau, Bamalli held the title of Magajin Garin Zazzau and served as Nigeria's Ambassador to Thailand, with concurrent accreditation to Myanmar.

== Emir of Zazzau ==
He was appointed as the new Emir of Zazzau by Nasir el-Rufai, Governor of Kaduna State on 7 October 2020. He is the second son of Nuhu Bamalli (Magajin Garin Zazzau).

Bamalli is the first emir from Mallawa ruling house in 100 years, following the demise of Alh Shehu Idris.

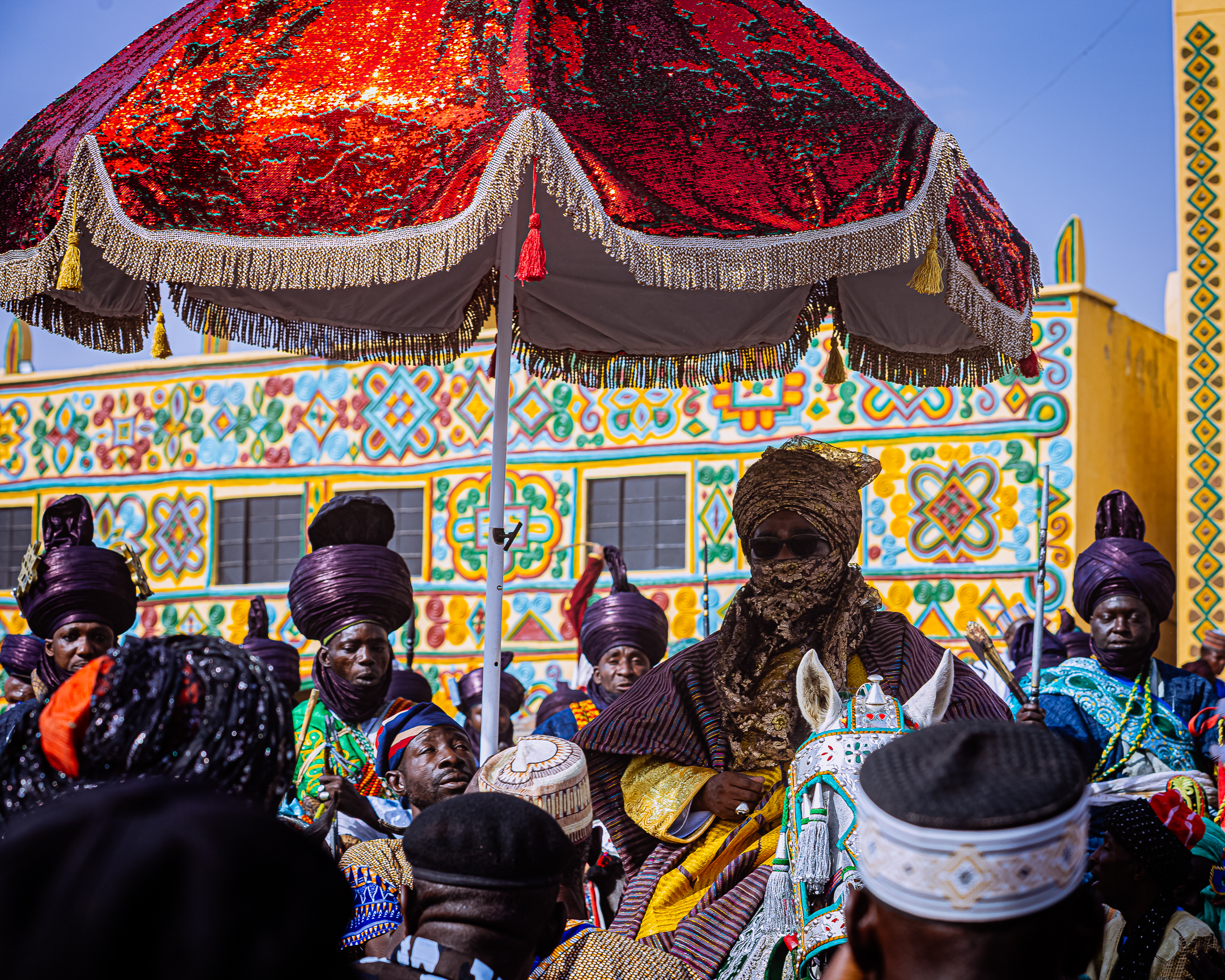
His_Highness,_the_Emir_of_Zazzau,_Mallam_Ahmed_Nuhu_Bamalli,_CFR

== Awards ==
In October 2022, a Nigerian national honor of Commander Of The Order Of The Federal Republic (CFR) was conferred on him by President Muhammadu Buhari.
