= Ja'afaru Dan Isiyaku =

Emir of zazzau (1937–1959)

- Emir of Zazzau
Era dates
- 1937 - 1959

Ja'afari Dan Isiyaku was the sixteenth Emir of Zazzau, he reigned from 1937 to 1959. As Emir of Zazzau he was administrative head of Zaria Emirate Native Authority which consisted of seventeen districts and he was responsible for the maintenance of law and order within the emirate.

== Life ==
Ja'afaru was born into the house of emir of Zazzau Abdullahi and his wife Malama Aishatu. His father was the grandson of Sarkin Zazzau Hammada and great-grandson of Sarki Yamusa (1821–1834) Ja'afaru's early education consisted of teachings and recitation of the Quran at an Islamic learning center in the neighborhood. He spent his first seven years in the district of Sabon Gari in his father house, thereafter, he journeyed to Zaria for additional Quranic studies. When he was around the age of 24 and had married, he was selected by his father to attend a school in Kano founded by a Swiss educationist, Hanns Vischer, the school was popularly called makarantar Dan Hausa in local parlance. He was among a few students from royal lineage who attended the school as Western education was treated with suspicion by many Northern emirs as a vehicle to preach Christianity at that time.

After a year attendance at the school, he returned to Zaria and continued with Islamic jurisprudence, learning the Maliki law. He also worked as a property rater with responsibility to assess the value of properties owned by households for taxation purposes. Ja'afaru was soon asked by the colonial resident to handle communications between the office of the resident and the Emir of Zazzau. In discharging the duties of his job Ja'afaru developed a relationship with the sitting emir, Aliyu Dan Sidi who sometimes delegated some responsibilities to Ja'afaru in matters affecting native authority administration. After about four years in the provincial office, he was promoted to the position of chief scribe to the resident. When the district head of Zangon Katab removed from office for embezzling funds from the cattle tax, Ja'afaru was selected as his replacement in 1918. Ja'afaru served as the district head for 19 years. In late 1936, Sarkin Ibrahim Dan Kwasau fell ill and died. The British resident appointed Ja'afaru as Sarkin Zazzau in March 1937 after consultation with the traditional kingmakers: Galadiman, Dokaje and Limamin.

=== Emir of Zazzau ===
Ja'afaru was crowned in June 1937 at the grounds within the emir's palace. Under Nigeria's indirect rule, British colonial government administered the colony of Nigeria through the traditional leaders and in the north it was through the emirs. Ja'afaru as emir became head of Zaria's Native Authority, he was in charge of maintaining law and order and the appointment of district heads within the emirate. Zaria in 1950 had seventeen district heads to assist the native authority in administration. As head of the native authority, he was involved in development works to expand the district of Tudun Wada.

During the pre-independence period, Ja'afaru was a member of the Northern Regional House of Chiefs and a minister without portfolio.
