= Joseph Oni =

Brigadier General Joseph Olayeni Oni

Governor of Niger State
- In office July 1978 – October 1979
- Preceded by: Okoh Ebitu Ukiwe
- Succeeded by: Awwal Ibrahim

Personal details
- Born: 5 July 1938 (age 88) Lagos, British Nigeria

Military service
- Allegiance: Nigeria
- Branch/service: Nigerian Army
- Rank: Brigadier General

Joseph Olayeni Oni (born 5 July 1938) was the military governor of Niger State, Nigeria from July 1978 to October 1979 during the military regime of General Olusegun Obasanjo. Oni replaced Navy Commander Okoh Ebitu Ukiwe. He established a budget of N157 million for 1979, of which N76 million was devoted to capital expenditure.

Promoted to Brigadier, Oni was commander of the 1st Division from 9 January 1984 to 16 September 1985. As Brigadier General, Oni was commander of the Headquarters Training and Doctrine Command, Nigerian Army, Minna from 15 September 1986 to 31 December 1987.
