= Ahmed Bolori =

Activist and Ambassador for Peace

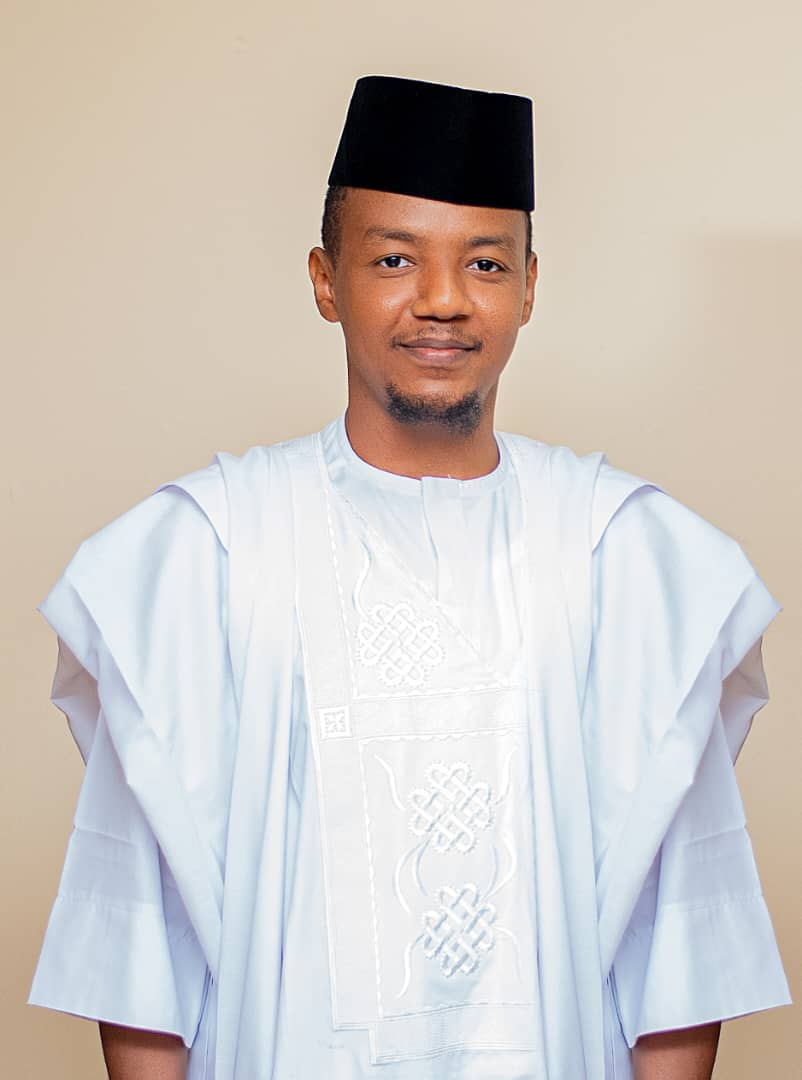
- Born: Ahmed Umar Bolori; Maiduguri, Borno State
- Citizenship: Nigeria
- Education: Ecotes Benin University; ABU Zaria; University of Abuja
- Occupations: Policy Advisor, Peace Advocate, Academic, Public Servant
- Political party: All Progressives Congress (APC)

Ahmed Umar Bolori ha is a Nigerian policy advisor and peace advocate from Borno State. He is the current Director of Policy and Partnerships at NewGlobe for the JigawaUNITE education program in Jigawa State, Nigeria. He has previously served as Special Adviser on Public Relations to the Governor of Kogi State and as Head of Communications and Liaison at the Kogi State Investment Promotion Agency.

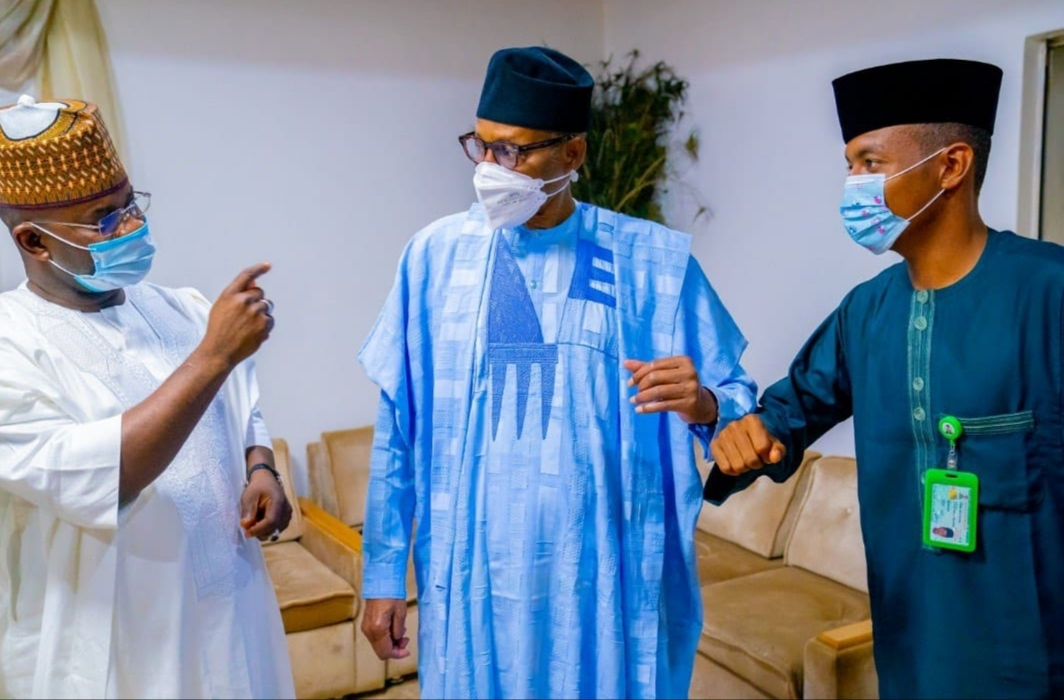
Governor Yahaya Bello presenting Ahmed Bolori to President Muhammadu Buhari

== Early life and education ==
Ahmed Bolori was born in Maiduguri, Borno State, Nigeria, into a Kanuri family. As part of his upbringing, he received Qur’anic education through the Almajiri system, a traditional practice in northern Nigeria where children leave home temporarily to study the Qur’an under Islamic scholars. He later continued with formal schooling.

He obtained a Doctor of Philosophy in Policy and Strategic Studies from the University of Abuja. He also earned master's degrees in International Affairs and Diplomacy, Information Management, and Law Enforcement and Criminal Justice from Ahmadu Bello University, Zaria. He obtained bachelor's degrees in Public Administration from Ahmadu Bello University and in International Relations from Ecotes University, Benin. He is undertaking doctoral research in Health Economics at the Federal University of Lafia.

== Career ==
As a social commentator, he has oftentimes appeared on BBC, Al-Jazeera, DW, among other local and international media outlets. Prior to his appointment as Special Adviser, Ahmed served as executive director of Exit Lanes, a nonprofit organization dedicated to peace building, social inclusion, and community development. Following Boko Haram insurgencies in Nigeria, Chad, Niger, and Cameroon, as well as other political instabilities that resulted in economic deprivation, poverty, and insecurity, Ahmed Bolori advocated for and coordinated a counterterrorism awareness network to improve education, peace building, de-radicalization, and youth empowerment to help counter/prevent violent extremism. He has worked with a variety of organizations on issues such as livelihood, protection and entrepreneurship development.

In order to address these challenges in the face of increasing terrorism pressure, Ahmed has participated in several conferences and meetings with international and national counterterrorism stakeholders such as the Nigerian Army, Nigerian National Security institutions, and stakeholders from the United Kingdom, the Middle East, and others from around the world. Ahmed met with Tibet's spiritual leader, Dalai Lama, one-on-one to learn about the pursuit of peace. He is an entrepreneur who shares the vision of the Sustainable Development Goals.

== Recognition ==
In 2017, the United States Institute of Peace selected Ahmed Bolori as one of 25 international Youth Leaders working in the world's most terrorized zones to build their capacity in working on peace building in their respective countries. The training which was held at the Dalai Lama's home in India, was also intended to better equip these youth leaders to rebuild their societies during and after violence. These among other achievements, has earned Ahmed an influence among his peers in Nigeria's North East, where terrorism is hampering growth and development. The Universal Peace Federation also appointed him as an Ambassador for Peace.

== Public attention ==
Following his participation in the dialogue process to end the Boko Haram insurgency in Northeast Nigeria, the Nigerian Army declared him wanted in 2016, along with Ahmed Salkida and Aisha Alkali Wakil. He turned himself in immediately after learning of his declaration, but the Nigerian Army authorities refused to detain him, instead asked him to go home and return the next day.

To motivate others, he has spoken publicly about his experience on social media and at TEDx events. The then Chief of Army Staff, Tukur Buratai, later publicly acknowledged his contributions to peacebuilding during an award event in Yola.
