= TY Shaban =

- Born: Tamim Yahuza Shaban; 4 February 1980 (age 46); Nassarawa, Kano
- Citizenship: Nigeria
- Education: Diploma in Film Production
- Alma mater: Yusuf Maitama Sule University, Kano
- Occupations: Singer, dancer, film producer and actor
- Known for: Musics
- Television: Dandalin Taurari Arewa 24
- Website: http://bluesoundmultimedia.com

Tamim Yahuza Shaban popularly known as TY Shaban or Shaba was a Nigerian singer, actor, dancer, TV Presenter, and film producer in the Northern Nigerian film industry popularly known as Kannywood.

== Early life and education ==
Shaban was born on 4 February 1980 in the Nasarawa area of Nasarawa Local Government Area of Kano State, Nigeria. He attended Brigade Primary School, Junior Secondary School at Kano Teachers College and Senior Secondary School at Government Secondary School Stadium Duka in Kano. He studied Agriculture at the Federal College of Education (Technical) Bichi. He also studied Public Administration at Kano Polytechnic. He also did a Diploma in Film Production at Yusuf Maitama Sule University, Kano, both in Kano State. TY Shaban is a singer and filmmaker and Film producer at Northern Nigeria Cinema Kannywood. TY Shaban is the father of Sani TY Shaban (Freiiboi) a 16-year-old Hausa Hip-hop singer from Northern Nigeria.

== Music industry ==
Shaban was first known in the field of Hausa musics. His songs "Uwargida Ran Gida" and "Shaba zo Taho" are well-known because they have reached every part of Hausa land.

== Filmography ==
- Fanan as MC (2021)
- Sarkin Barayi as Dumga (2020)
- Komai Nisan Dare as Munkaila (2019)
- Barazana as Brown (2019)
- Kawayen Amarya as Doctor Umar (2018)
- Kanwar Dubarudu (2017)
- Kowa Dalin (2016)
- Madubin Dubawa as Aboki 2 (2012)
- Komai Nisan Dare as associate producer (2019)
- Barazana as producer (2019).

== Film industry ==
After his music career, Shaban became involved in the film industry, appearing in films and becoming a producer. In 2019, BBC Hausa placed Shaban's film in the Top Ten of Hausa movies.
