= Suleja Emirate =

Suleja emirate
- Traditional state
- Location within Nigeria
- Coordinates: 9°11′N 7°11′E
- Country: Nigeria
- State: Niger State

Government
  - Emir (Sarkin Zazzau): Awwal Ibrahim

Area
  - Total: 2,980 km^{2} (1,150 sq mi)
- Time zone: UTC+1 (West Africa Time)

The Suleja Emirate (Hausa: Masarautar Suleja) is a Hausa principality in what is now Niger State, Nigeria. The emirate was established as the Abuja Emirate during the 19th century as a successor to the Kingdom of Zazzau, and was located just north of the site of the present-day federal capital city named Abuja. When the new city was established, the emirate and its capital were renamed the Suleja Emirate and Suleja. The emirate covers about 1,150 square miles (2,980 square km) of wooded savanna area. Suleja Emirate, Kontagora Emirate, Borgu Emirate, Agaie Emirate and Kagara Emirate were the major Emirates in Niger state.

== History ==
The current emirate originally included four small Koro chiefdoms that paid tribute to the Hausa Zazzau Emirate. After warriors of the Fulani jihad (holy war) captured Zaria, the Kingdom of Zazzau's capital, 137 miles (220 km) north-northeast in about 1804, Muhammadu Makau, sarki (king) of Zazzau, led many of the Hausa nobility to the Koro town of Zuba. Abu Ja (Jatau), his brother and successor as Sarkin Zazzau, founded Abuja town in 1828, began construction of its wall a year later, and proclaimed himself the first sarki of Abuja, while retaining the title Sarkin Zazzau. Withstanding Zazzau's attacks, the Abuja emirate remained an independent Hausa refuge. Trade with the Fulani emirates of Bida (to the west) and Zazzau (now the city of Zaria) began in Emir Abu Kwaka's reign (1851–77).

When Abuja's leaders disrupted the trade route between Lokoja and Zaria in 1902, the British occupied the town. Alluvial tin mining began in Emir Musa Angulu's reign (1917–44). In 1976 a large part of the emirate plus territory from other states became the Federal Capital Territory, centred on the new city of Abuja. The emirate was renamed Suleja, based on the renamed town of Suleja which remained in Niger State.

Awwal Ibrahim became the Emir, or Sarkin Zazzau, of Suleja in 1993. His accession resulted in rioting and destruction of property by opponents. He was deposed on 10 May 1994 by General Sani Abacha. After the return to democracy, Awwal Ibrahim was restored to his title of Emir of Suleja on 17 January 2000. His restoration again caused a series of violent clashes, forcing the government to call in anti-riot troopers and impose a 20-hour curfew.

== List of rulers ==
Following is a list of the rulers of the emirate.

Start	End	Ruler
1804	1825	Muhammadu Makau dan Ishaqu Jatau (d. 1825)
1825	2 August 1851	Jatau "Abu Ja" dan Ishaqu Jatau (d. 1851)
2 August 1851	29 July 1877	Abu Kwaka "Dogon Sarki" dan Ishaqu Jatau (d. 1877)
29 July 1877	August 1902	Ibrahim "Iyalai" "Dodon Gwari" dan Jatau (d. 1902)
1902	1917	Muhammad Gani dan Abu Kwaka
May 1917	3 March 1944	Musa Angulu dan Ibrahim (d. 1944)
13 March 1944	1979	Sulaimanu Barau dan Muhammad Gani (d. 1979)
1979	1993	Malam Ibrahim Dodo Musa (d. 1993)
1993	10 May 1994	Awwal Ibrahim (1st time) (b. 1941)
10 May 1994	17 January 2000	Bashir Sulaiman Barau
17 January 2000		Awwal Ibrahim (2nd time)
