= Bako (name) =

- Gender: Male
- Language: Hausa

Origin
- Origin: Nigerian
- Meaning: A male child who was born after arrival of visitors in a household
- Region of origin: Northern, Nigeria

Bako is a Nigerian name of Hausa origin, serving as both a given name and surname. It means "A male child who was born after arrival of visitors in a household."

== Notable individuals with the name ==
- Audu Bako (1924–1980), Military-Governor of Kano and Nigerian police officer
- Brigitte Bako (born 1967), Canadian actress
- Ibrahim Bako (1943–1983), Nigerian senior officer in the Nigerian Army
- Ishaya Bako (born 1986), Nigerian film director and screenwriter
- Jarosław Bako (born 1964), Polish footballer
- Muhammadu Bako III (born 1972), Emir of New Karshi in Nigeria North Central State of Nasarawa and a former career federal civil servant
- Paul Bako (born 1972), American baseball player
- Sadissou Bako (born 1976), Cameroonian footballer
- Tisan Bako, Nigerian radio personality and presenter
- Yakubu Bako, Nigerian governor of Akwa Ibom State, Nigeria
- Yolanda Bako (born 1946), American feminist and activist against domestic violence
- Dahiru Bako Gassol (born 1954), Nigerian Senator for the Taraba Central Senatorial District of Taraba State, Nigeria
- Simon Bako Lalong (born 1963), Nigerian lawyer and politician, Governor of Plateau State, Nigeria.
