= Awwal Ibrahim =

Nigerian traditional ruler

Mohammed Awwal Ibrahim
- Sarkin Zazzau Suleja

Emir of Suleja
- 2nd reign: 17 January 2000 – present
- Predecessor: Bashir Sulaiman Barau
- 1st reign: 1993 – 10 May 1994
- Predecessor: Ibrahim Dodo Musa
- Successor: Bashir Sulaiman Barau
- Born: September 8, 1941 (age 84); Abuja, Niger Province, Colonial Nigeria

Governor of Niger State
- In office October 1979 – December 1983
- Deputy: Idris Alhassan Kpaki
- Preceded by: Joseph Oni
- Succeeded by: David Mark

Personal details
- Party: National Party of Nigeria (1979 – 1983)

Alhaji Mohammed Awwal Ibrahim (born September 8, 1941) is a Nigerian traditional ruler who served as governor of Niger State from October 1979 to December 1983 during the Nigerian Second Republic. He was elected on the National Party of Nigeria (NPN) platform.

== Early life and education ==
Ibrahim was born in Abuja, now known as Suleja in September 8, 1941. He attended Provincial Secondary School, Bida from 1956 to 1961 and continued further studies at the School for Arabic Studies, Kano. He earned a degree in English from Abdullahi Bayero College in 1967 and a masters in 1970. He joined Ahmadu Bello University in 1967 as a lecturer of languages. From 1967 to 1976, Ibrahim moved up within the administrative ranks, he was acting registrar of Bayero University Kano and Executive Secretary of the Center for Cultural Studies between 1973 and 1975. When Niger State was created in 1976, his services was transferred to the new state as an administrator. He was initially acting Permanent Secretary for Special Duties before becoming the Permanent Secretary for Local Government.

== Governor ==
In 1979, he left civil service to contest for as a candidate for Governor of Niger State under the National Party of Nigeria (NPN). Ibrahim won the primary and defeated in challenges in the gubernatorial states elections to become the first elected Governor of Niger State. There were attempts to impeach Ibrahim while he was governor. He was forced out of office after the coup that brought General Muhammadu Buhari to power. A military tribunal set up by the Buhari government convicted him of abuse of power and corruption 1984. In 1986 he was barred for life from holding public office or participating in partisan politics.

== Emir of Suleja ==
The Suleja Emirate is a Hausa emirate established in the early 19th century, formerly called Abuja, in what is now Niger State. In 1976 a large part of the emirate plus territory from other states became the Federal Capital Territory, centered on the new city of Abuja. The emirate was renamed Suleja, based on the renamed town of Suleja which remained in Niger State. Awwal Ibrahim became the Emir, or Sarki, of Suleja in 1993. His accession resulted in rioting and destruction of property by opponents. He was deposed on 10 May 1994 by General Sani Abacha.

After the return to democracy, Awwal Ibrahim was restored to his title of Emir of Suleja on 17 January 2000. His restoration again caused a series of violent clashes, forcing the government to call in anti-riot troopers and impose a 20-hour curfew. Twenty one people were arrested including the chairman of the Suleja Emirate, Alhaji Shuaibu Barda. Speaking at Awwal Ibrahim's palace in June 2008, Niger State governor Muazu Babangida Aliyu noted the environmental and social problems that expansion of the federal capital has caused to the ancient city of Suleja and called for federal funding to accelerate development.

In September 2001, Ibrahim was awarded the title of Commander of the Niger. In 2010 he was chairman of the Niger State government's Committee on Reformation of Almajirci. The Almajirci are itinerant students of the Quran who depend on alms to survive.
