= Emir of Zazzau =

Ruler of Zazzau

- Flag of the Zazzau Emirate

Incumbent
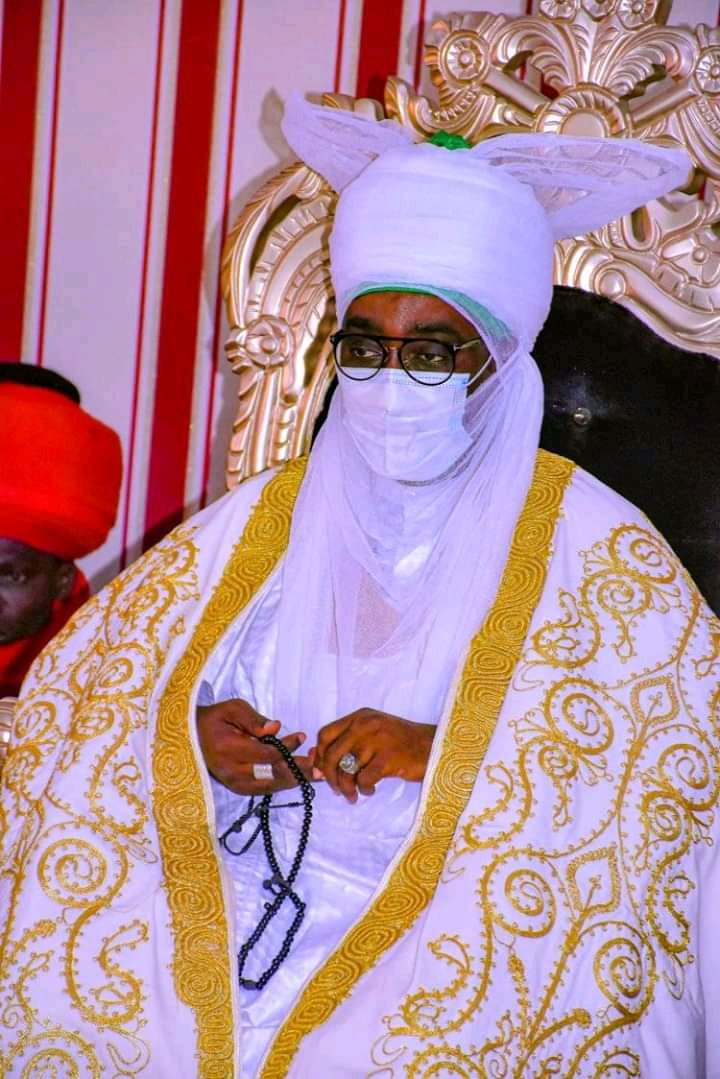
- Ahmed Nuhu Bamalli since 7 October 2020

Details
- Appointer: Zazzau Emirate Council with approval from the Kaduna State Government

The Emir of Zazzau , known as Sarkin Zazzau in the Hausa language, is the traditional ruler based in Zaria, which was also known as Zazzau in the past. Although in centuries past, the emirs ruled as absolute monarchs, in the 20th and 21st centuries Nigerian traditional rulers hold little constitutional power, but wield considerable behind-the-scenes influence on the government. The emir's residence is in the historic palace in the town of Zaria.

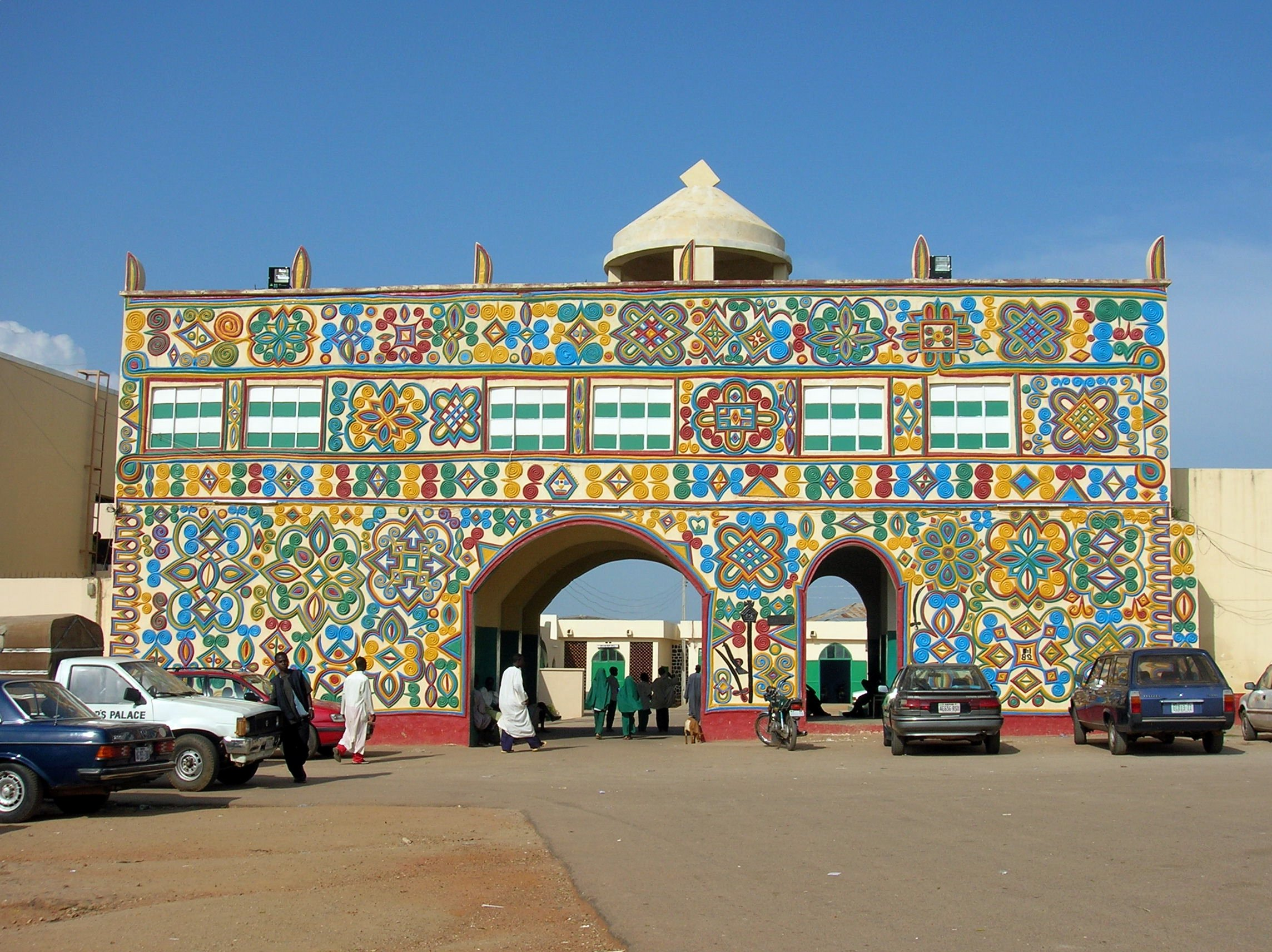
Gate to the palace of the emir of Zazzau

Shehu Idris was emir from 1975 until his death on September 20, 2020, at the age of 84. Idris was the longest reigning monarch in the history of the Zazzau emirate, having reigned for 45 years. During his reign in Zaria and envirous he considered peace over other things. He always create an atmosphere of peace with difference tribes that lives in Zaria. Mallam Ahmed Nuhu Bamalli succeeded the late Emir

The Kaduna State Government appointed Alhaji Ahmed Nuhu Bamalli as the 19th Emir of Zazzau on 7 October 2020.

He became the first emir from the Mallawa ruling house in 100 years, following the demise in 1920 of his grandfather, Emir Alu Dan Sidi.

The Zazzau emirate is located in Zaria Local Government of Kaduna State. The emirate is old emirate that probably started in 15 century with the main tribes of Hausa and Fulani people.

== History of Zazzau ==
The Zazzau emirate traditionally started when king Gunguma founded it as one of the original of Hausa Bakwai with the function of capturing slaves from all other Hausa Barwar.

== See also ==
- Suleja Emirate
