= Hausa Day =

Annual cultural celebration

- Official name: Hausa Day
- Observed by: Hausa people
- Type: International
- Celebrations: Cultural and educational events
- Date: 26 August
- Next time: 26 August 2026
- Frequency: annual

Hausa Day (Hausa: Ranar Hausa), formally known as #RanarHausa, is an annual cultural celebration observed on 26 August by the Hausa people, an ethnic group of West Africa. The day celebrates Hausa cultural heritage, traditions, language, and art. World Hausa Day is celebrated in the Hausa diaspora.

== History ==
Hausa Day was introduced on August 26, 2015, by Nigerian journalist Abdulbaki Aliyu Jari. Jari's goal was to promote the Hausa language online and raise awareness of the challenges facing it. Jari suggested participants use Hausa on their social media, either by posting adages or coming up with new Hausa words for emerging ideas and technology. He also asked participants to share photos of Hausa traditions and culture.

== Events ==
In-person celebrations of Hausa Day have been held in Ghana and Nigeria, and in locations outside of West Africa, such as Istanbul.

Celebrations may include Hausa foods, musical performances, Dambe competitions, and demonstrations of traditional Hausa crafts.

=== Ghana ===
In 2022, the Hausa community in Accra, Ghana held a Hausa Day event, with the theme, "Hausa, an Indispensable Tool in Ghana's Development". The event aimed to unite Hausa youths across Ghana, encouraging them to showcase and support their talents and abilities. The event was attended by Ghanaian delegates alongside the notable linguistic personalities such John Dramani Mahama, the National Chief Imam, Sheikh (Dr) Osman Nuhu Sharubutu. A highlight of the celebration was the traditional wrestling competition, Dambe.

=== Nigeria ===
By 2020, in-person Hausa Day events were held in 16 Nigerian states.

In 2024, a Hausa Day event in Kaduna was organized by the Centre for the Development of Hausa Language.

The palace of the Emir of Daura, located in the ancient city of Daura in Katsina State, hosted the 2025 International Hausa Day celebration.

Participants from various countries across Africa, Europe, the Middle East, Asia, and the Americas attended the event, which aimed to showcase Daura as the cradle of the Hausa people and their language to a global audience of millions.

== See also ==
- Hausa people
- Hausa language
- Hausa kingdoms
