= Hausa people =

Ethnic group in West Africa

Hausa
مُتَنٜىٰنْ هَوْسَا / هَوْسَاوَا Mutanen Hausa / Hausawa
- This emblem is an older and traditionally established symbol of Hausa identity. The star-shaped emblem, called the 'Dagin Arewa', or 'Northern Knot', is used in historic and traditional architecture, design, and hand-embroidery.

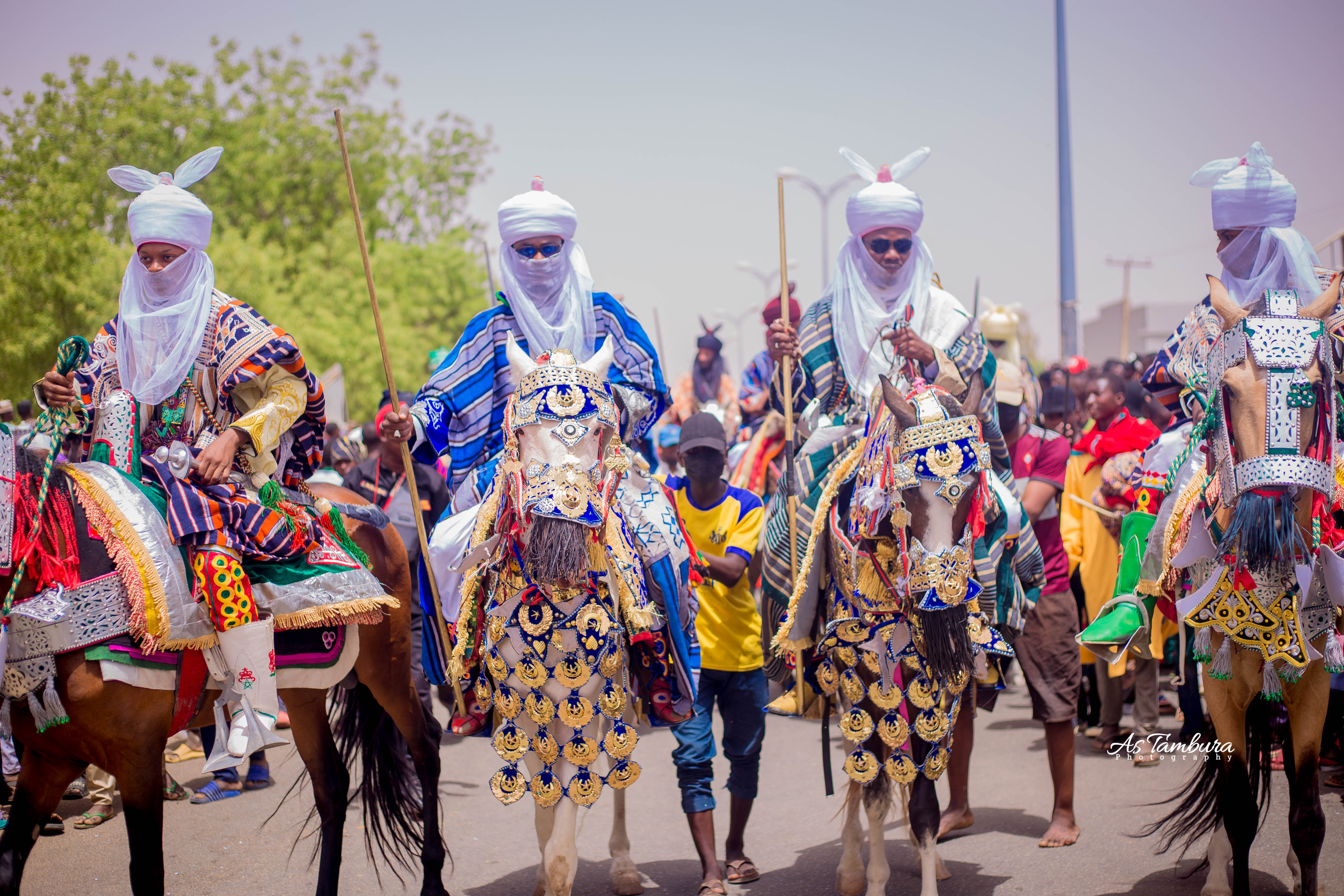
- Hausa horsemen during Durbar

Total population
- 86 million

Regions with significant populations
- Nigeria: 71,000,000
- Niger: 13,800,000
- Ivory Coast: 1,000,000
- Sudan: 664,000
- Cameroon: 400,000
- Ghana: 275,000
- Benin: 36,360
- Eritrea: 30,000
- Togo: 21,900
- Gabon: 17,000
- Algeria: 12,000

Languages
- Hausa • English • African French • Pidgin English

Religion
- Islam

Related ethnic groups
- Sahelians, other Chadic-speaking peoples

- Person: m: Bahaushe f: Bahaushiya
- People: Hausawa
- Language: Harshen Hausa / Halshen Hausa
- Country: Kasar Hausa / Masarautun Hausa

The Hausa people (Note: autonyms for singular: Bahaushe (m), Bahaushiya (f); plural: Hausawa and general: Hausa; exonyms: Ausa; Ajami: مُتَنٜىٰنْ هَوْسَا / هَوْسَاوَا) are an ethnic group native to West Africa. They speak the Hausa language, which is the second most spoken language after Arabic in the Afro-Asiatic language family. The Hausa are a culturally homogeneous people based primarily in the Sahelian and the sparse savanna areas of southern Niger and northern Nigeria respectively, numbering around 86 million people, with significant populations in Benin, Cameroon, Côte d’Ivoire, Chad, the Central African Republic, Togo, and Ghana, as well as smaller, more recent populations in Sudan and Eritrea.

Predominantly Hausa-speaking communities are scattered throughout West Africa and on the traditional Hajj route north and east traversing the Sahara, with an especially large population in and around the town of Agadez. Other Hausa have also moved to large neighbouring coastal cities in the region such as Lagos, Port Harcourt, Accra, Abidjan and Cotonou as well as to parts of North Africa such as Libya over the course of the last 500 years. The Hausa are traditionally agriculturists who live in small villages as well as in precolonial towns and cities. The Hausa aristocracy had historically developed an equestrian based culture. Still a status symbol of the traditional nobility in Hausa society, the horse still features in the Eid day celebrations, known as Ranar Sallah ('the Day of the Prayer'). Daura is the cultural center of the Hausa people. The town predates all the other major Hausa towns in tradition and culture.

== Population distribution ==
In the last millennia, the Hausa have migrated throughout Africa for several reasons. These include military service, long-distance trade, hunting, performance of hajj, fleeing from oppressive feudal Hausa kings, and propagating Islam.

The vast majority of Hausas and Hausa speakers are Muslim. Attempts to embark on the hajj pilgrimage have resulted in some settling in regions from western and sub-saharan Africa to the Hijaz region. Many Hausa in Saudi Arabia identify as both Hausa and Afro-Arab. In the Arab world, the surname "Hausawi" (alternatively spelled "Hawsawi") is an indicator of Hausa ancestry.

The homeland of Hausa people is Hausaland ("Kasar Hausa"), situated in Nigeria and Niger.

== History ==
Daura, in Nigeria, is the oldest city of Hausaland. Historically, Katsina was the centre of Hausa Islamic scholarship but was later replaced by Sokoto stemming from the 19th century Usman Dan Fodio Islamic reform.

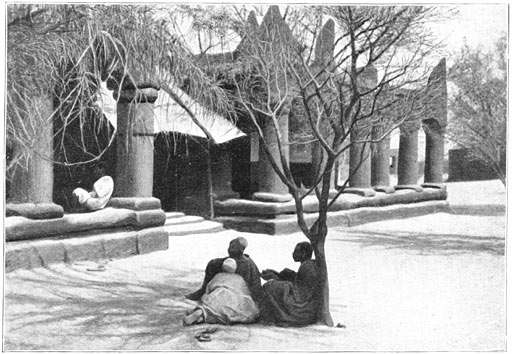
Photo of Sultan of Zinder's palace courtyard, 1906.

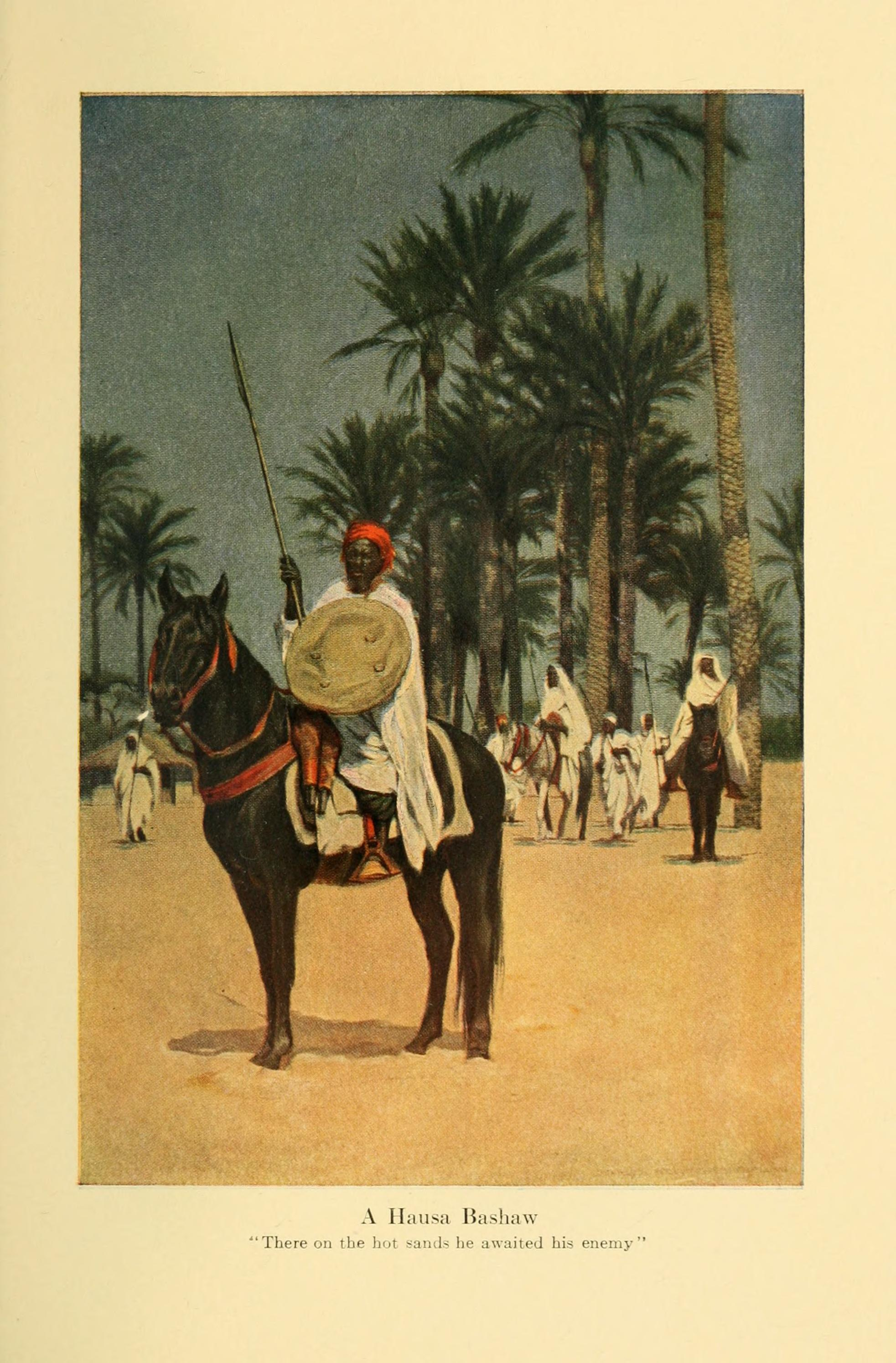

In the 7th century, the Dalla Hill 3Kano was the site of a Hausa community that migrated from Gaya and engaged in iron-work. The Hausa Bakwai kingdoms were established around the 7th to 11th centuries. Of these, the Kingdom of Daura was the first, according to the Bayajidda legend. The legend of Bayajidda is a relatively new concept in the history of the Hausa people and is generally disregarded as myth by scholars.

The Hausa Kingdoms were independent political entities in what is now Nigeria and emerged, predominantly in the 16th century, as powerful and economically important trading states. Similarly to Bornu and other neighbouring cities, Hausa states like Katsina and Kano became major centres of long-distance trans-saharan trade with Hausa merchants specializing in producing textiles and leatherwork. The primary exports were leather, gold, cloth, salt, kola nuts, slaves, and henna with the Hausa people acting as a median of trade within West Africa. By the 14th century, Islam had become widespread in the Hausa states due to commerce, with Muhammad Korau of Gobir generally attested as the first Muslim ruler by the mid 14th century, though smaller populations of Hausas, like the Maguzawa remained followers of the traditional Hausa religion.

By the early 15th century, the Hausa were using a modified Arabic script known as ajami to record their own language. The Hausa compiled several written histories, the most popular being the Kano Chronicle. Many medieval Hausa manuscripts similar to the Timbuktu Manuscripts written in the Ajami script have been discovered recently, some of them describing constellations and calendars.

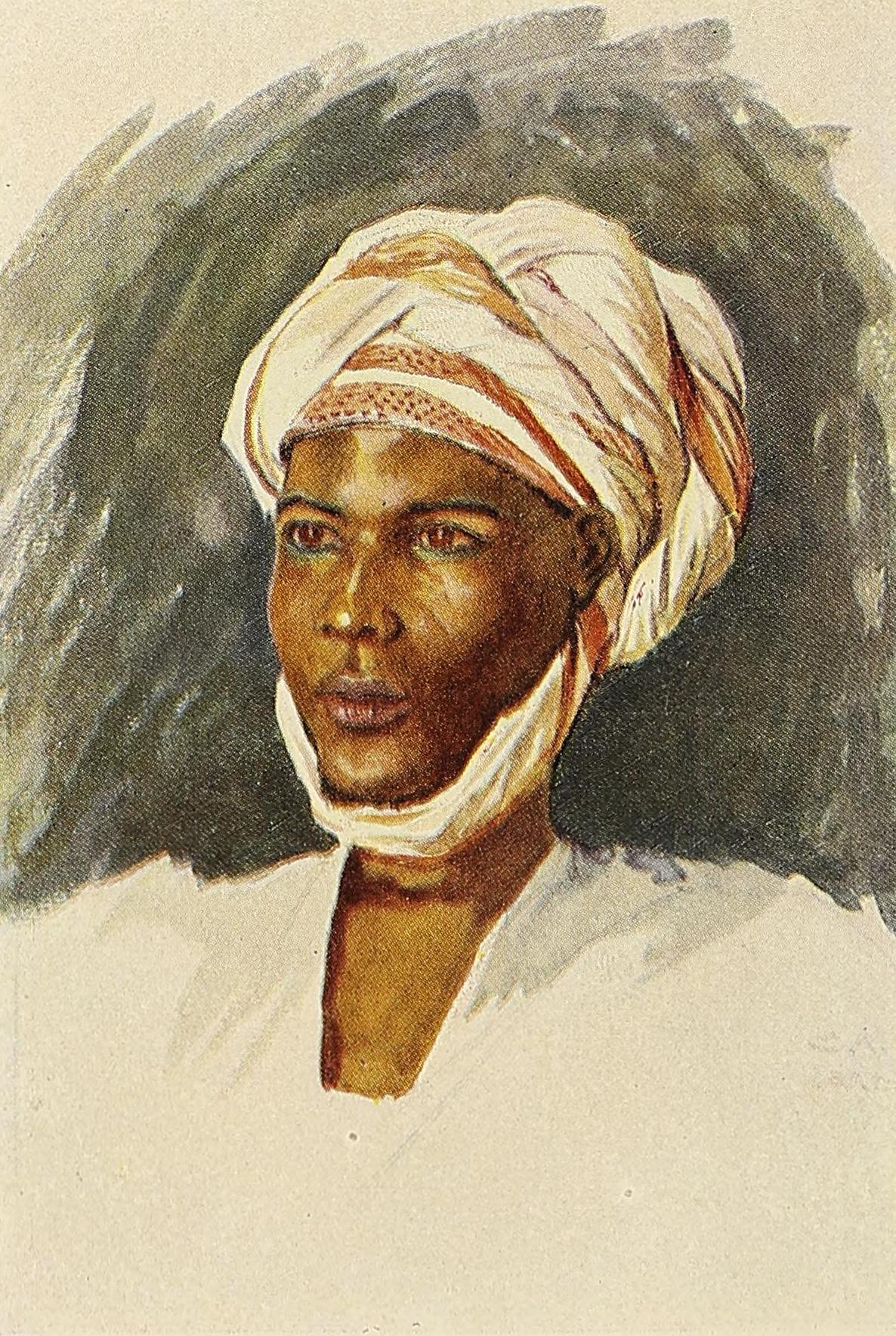
A depiction of a Hausa man from Gobir by Carl Arriens (1913)

The Gobarau Minaret was built in the 14th century in Katsina. It is a 50-foot edifice located in the centre of the city of Katsina, the capital of Katsina State. The construction of the Gobarau minaret, was commissioned and designed by Muhammadu Korau (also spelled Muhammad Korau), the first Muslim ruler of Katsina to serve as a Mosque and symbolizing Katsina's early adoption of the Islamic faith. Built in traditional Hausa Tuabli architecture, the minaret served as a center for Islamic education and later as a defensive hub during wartime. The minaret is also believed to be one of West Africa's first multi-storey buildings and was once the tallest building in Katsina.

Muhammad Rumfa was the Sultan of the Sultanate of Kano, located in modern-day Kano State, Northern Nigeria. He reigned from 1463 until 1499. Among Rumfa's accomplishments were extending the city walls, building a large palace, the Gidan Rumfa, promoting slaves to governmental positions and establishing the great Kurmi Market, which is still in use today. It was once used as an international market where North African goods were exchanged for domestic goods through trans-Saharan trade. Muhammad Rumfa was also responsible for much of the Islamisation of Kano, as he got the general population to convert.

The legendary Queen Amina of Zaria ruled Zazzau sometime during mid 16th century for a period of 34 years, though there are some discrepancies about the dates of her reign. According to oral legends detailed by anthropologist David E. Jones, Amina was brought up in her grandfather's court and was carefully taught in political and military matters. Amina was 16 years old when her mother, Bakwa Turunku became queen and she was given the traditional title of Magajiya, an honorific borne by the daughters of monarchs. She is celebrated as an outstanding conqueror who extended her dominion from Kwararafa state to Nupe, the Niger and Benue rivers, subdued Bauchi and extracted tribute from Kano & Katsina while also establishing long standing commerce with the Yoruba markets of the south. Amina is credited as the architectural overseer and financier of much of the Tubali walls that surround her city, which were the prototype for the fortifications used in all Hausa states. Subsequently her name is associated widely with fortifications all over the Hausa states known as Ganuwar Amina or Amina's walls. Though not all of the city walls known as Ganuwar Amina can be attributed to her, such connections highlight her imperial successes; they also identify the 15th century as a period of intense action, akin to a revolution, in defence of the Hausa kingdoms.

In the 1836 book, Ifaq al-Maysur, authored by Sultan Muhammad Bello of Sokoto he states that, "Amina was the first to establish government among the Hausa" and she claimed ascendancy over the cities of Kano and Katsina. Since Muhammad Bello provided only limited details about Amina’s life, historians primarily rely on the Kano Chronicle —a widely cited 19th-century historical account of Kano—for more comprehensive information.

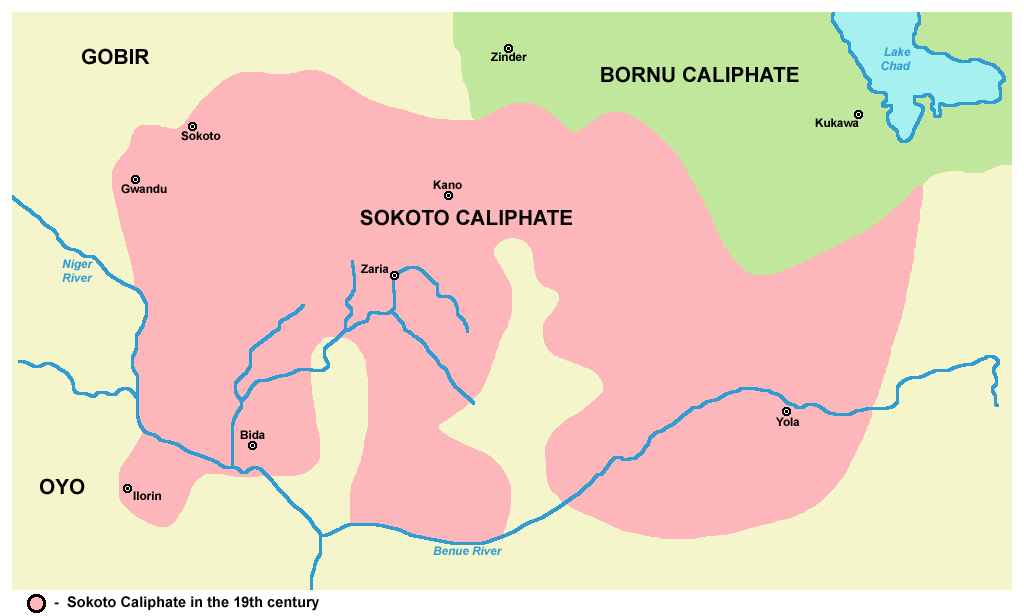
The Hausa–Fulani Sokoto Caliphate in the 19th century

From the beginning of the 1800s, the Fulas began to migrate to Nigeria from Senegal, Mauritania and other neighbouring countries. Driven by cattle herding, trade, and environmental pressures, these nomadic groups gradually settled among the indigenous agricultural Hausa populations, often maintaining distinct clans while adopting the Hausa language and intermarrying. In the early 19th century, the Fula Islamic scholar Usman dan Fodio launched the Sokoto jihad (1804–1808), accusing Hausa rulers of practising a syncretic and corrupt form of Islam that deviated from “true” Islamic principles, including tolerance of pre-Islamic customs and unjust taxation. The successful jihad overthrew most Hausa kingdoms, establishing the Sokoto Caliphate under Fula leadership and profoundly reshaping the religious and political landscape of Nigeria. The political and social integration following the Sokoto jihad gave rise to the modern socio-political label “Hausa-Fulani”, which primarily refers to the Muslim ruling elite of northern Nigeria. Despite the widespread use of this hyphenated term—especially in modern Nigerian political discourse—the Hausa and Fulas remain culturally and genetically distinct: the Hausa are predominantly sedentary agriculturalists with ancient Chadic-language roots in the region, whereas the Fulas are historically pastoralist and trace their origins to the western Sahel, retaining a separate Fulfulde language, clan structure (lenyol) system, and higher frequencies of certain West African pastoralist genetic markers. The “Hausa-Fulani” identity is therefore largely a product of 19th-century Fula political dominance within the Sokoto Caliphate, and shared religion rather than an indication of ethnic or genetic fusion; many Fulas in Nigeria continue to identify separately as Bororo or Town Fulas, and rural Hausa communities often preserve pre-jihad culture and traditions with minimal Fula admixture.—for more comprehensive information

British colonial administrator Frederick Lugard exploited rivalries between many of the emirs in the south and the central Sokoto administration to counter possible defence efforts as his men marched toward the capital. As the British approached the city of Sokoto, the new Sultan Muhammadu Attahiru I organised a quick defence of the city and fought the advancing British-led forces. The British emerged triumphant, sending Attahiru I and thousands of followers on a Mahdist hijra.

On 13 March 1903 at the grand market square of Sokoto, the last Vizier of the Caliphate officially conceded to British rule. The British appointed Muhammadu Attahiru II as the new Caliph. Lugard abolished the Caliphate, but retained the title Sultan as a symbolic position in the newly organised Northern Nigeria Protectorate. In June 1903, the British defeated the remaining forces of Attahiru I, who was killed in action; by 1906 resistance to British rule had ended with the conquest of Hadejia and the death of Sarki Muhammadu Mai Shahada of Hadejia as the last Emirate standing in Sokoto Caliphate. The area of the Sokoto Caliphate was divided among the control of the British, French, and Germans under the terms of the Berlin Conference.—for more comprehensive information

Art of a Kano horseman wearing lifidi (cotton-padded armour)

The British established the Northern Nigeria Protectorate to govern the region, which included most of the Sokoto empire and its most important emirates. Under Lugard, the various emirs were provided significant local autonomy, thus retaining much of the political organisation of the Sokoto Caliphate. The Sokoto area was treated as just another emirate within the Nigerian Protectorate. Because it was never connected with the railway network, it became economically and politically marginal.

The Sultan of Sokoto continued to be regarded as an important Muslim spiritual and religious position; the lineage connection to dan Fodio has continued to be recognised. One of the most significant Sultans was Siddiq Abubakar III, who held the position for 50 years from 1938 to 1988. He was known as a stabilising force in Nigerian politics, particularly in 1966 after the assassination of Ahmadu Bello, the Premier of Northern Nigeria.

Following the construction of the Nigerian railway system, which extended from Lagos in 1896 to Ibadan in 1900 and Kano in 1911, the Hausa of northern Nigeria became major producers of groundnuts. They British authorities had expected the Hausa to turn to cotton production but "Within two years the peasant farmers of Hausaland were producing so many tonnes of groundnuts that the railway was unable to cope with the traffic. As a result, the European merchants in Kano had to stockpile sacks of groundnuts in the streets." (Shillington 338).

The Boko script was implemented by the British and French colonial authorities and made the official Hausa alphabet in 1930. Boko is a Latin alphabet used to write the Hausa language. The first boko was devised by Europeans in the early 19th century, and developed in the early 20th century by the British (mostly) and French colonial authorities. Since the 1950s, boko has been the main alphabet for Hausa. Arabic script (ajami) is now only used in Islamic schools and for Islamic literature. Today millions of Hausa-speaking people, who can read and write in Ajami only, are considered illiterates by the Nigerian government. Despite this, Hausa Ajami is present on Naira banknotes. In 2014, in a very controversial move, Ajami was removed from the new 100 Naira banknote.

Nevertheless, the Hausa remain preeminent in Niger and Northern Nigeria.

== Subgroups of Hausa people ==
Hausas in the narrow sense are indigenous of Kasar Hausa (Hausaland) who are found in West Africa. Within the Hausa, a distinction is made between two subgroups: Habe and Banza or Banza Bakwai.

- "Habe" are taken to be pure Hausas. They include Gobirawa, Kabawa, Rumawa, Adarawa, Maouri, and others. These groups were the rulers of Hausa Kingdoms before the Danfodiyo revolution (Jihad) of 1804.
- "Banza or Banza Bakwai" according to some modern historians are people who are of ancient tribes and extinct languages in Hausaland, of whose history little is known. They include Ajawa, Gere, Bankal, and others.

== Genetics ==
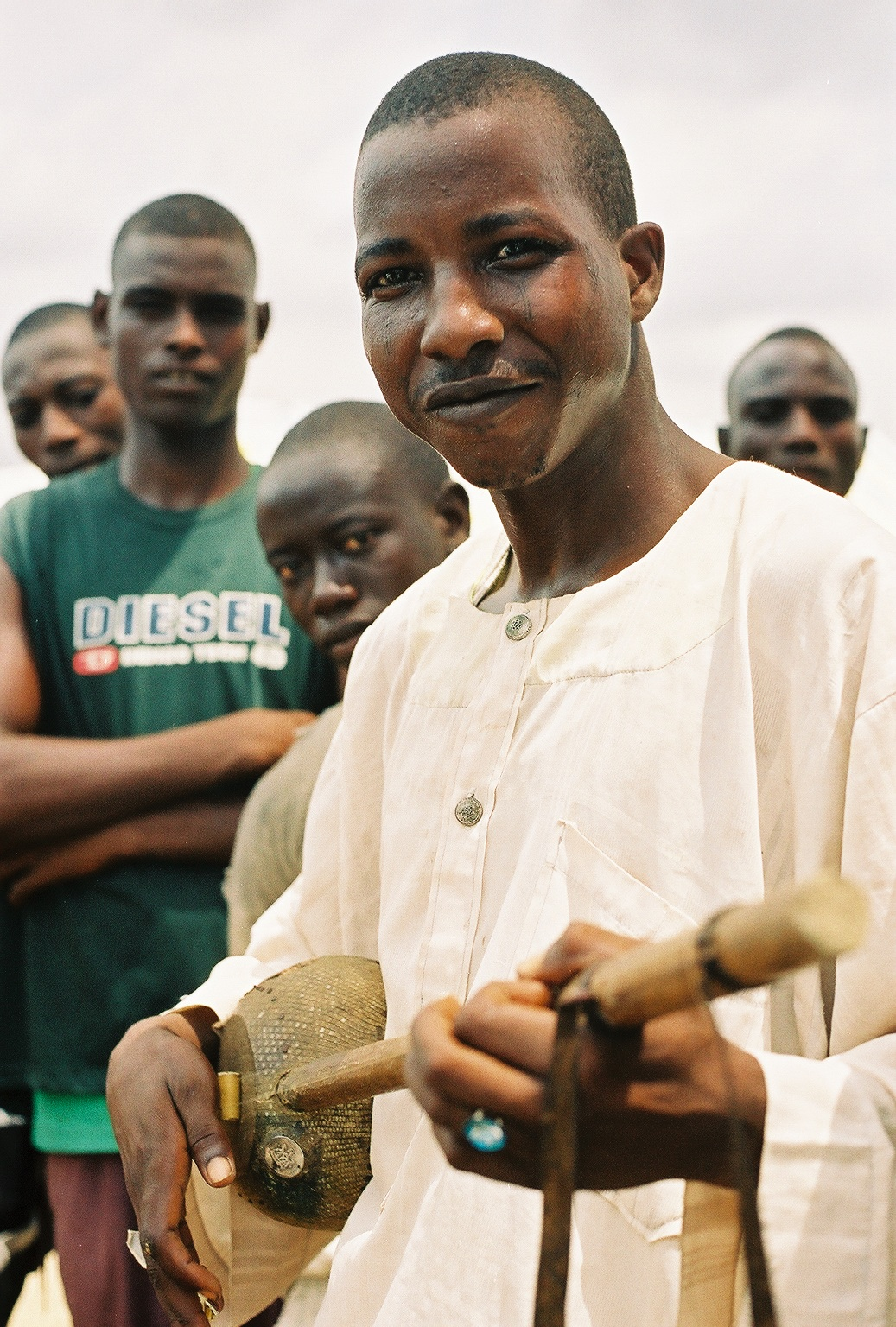
A Hausa gurmi lute player

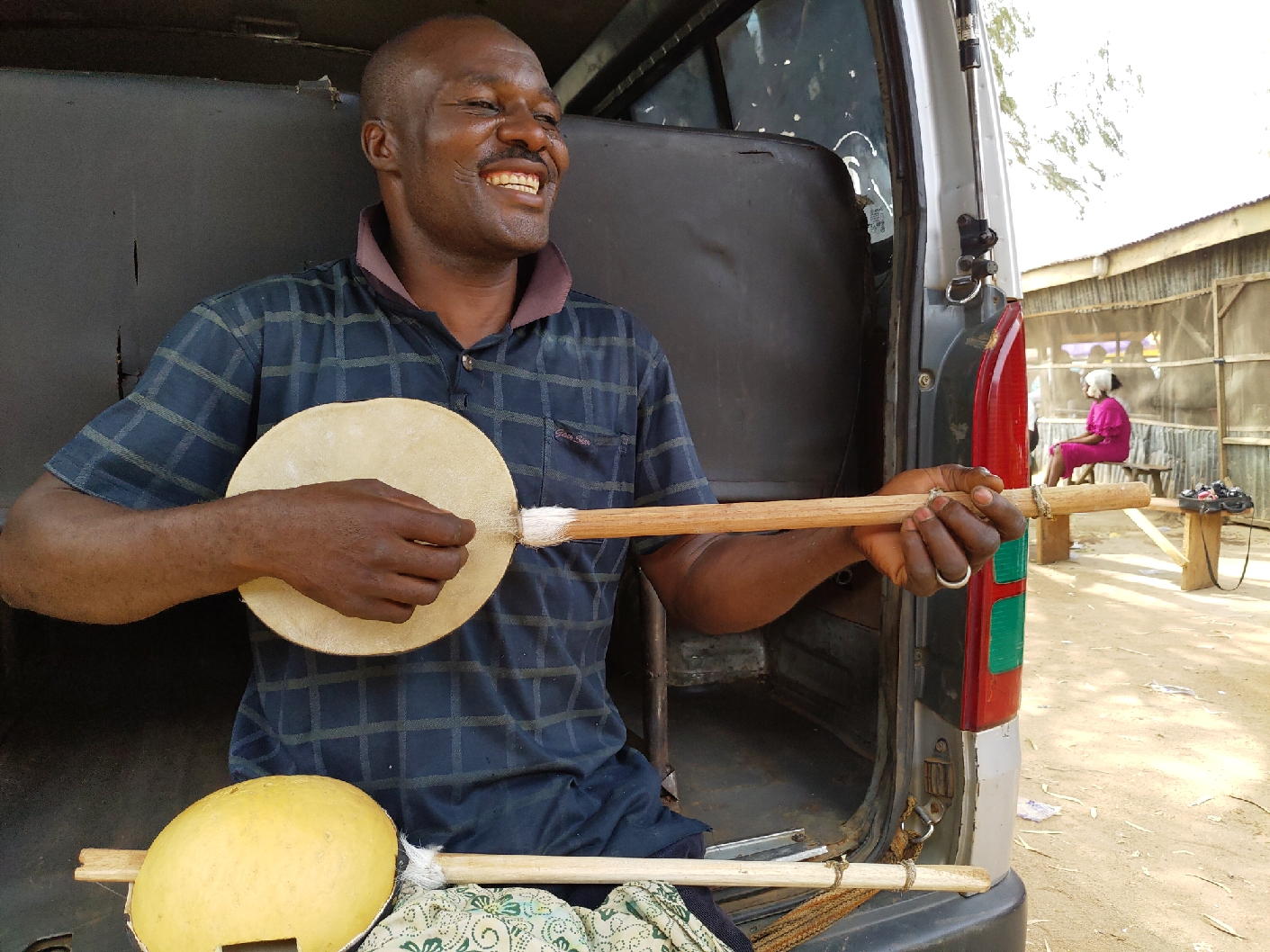
A man playing a garaya lute. This may be a Fula version, as both the Fula people and the Hausa people make the instrument.

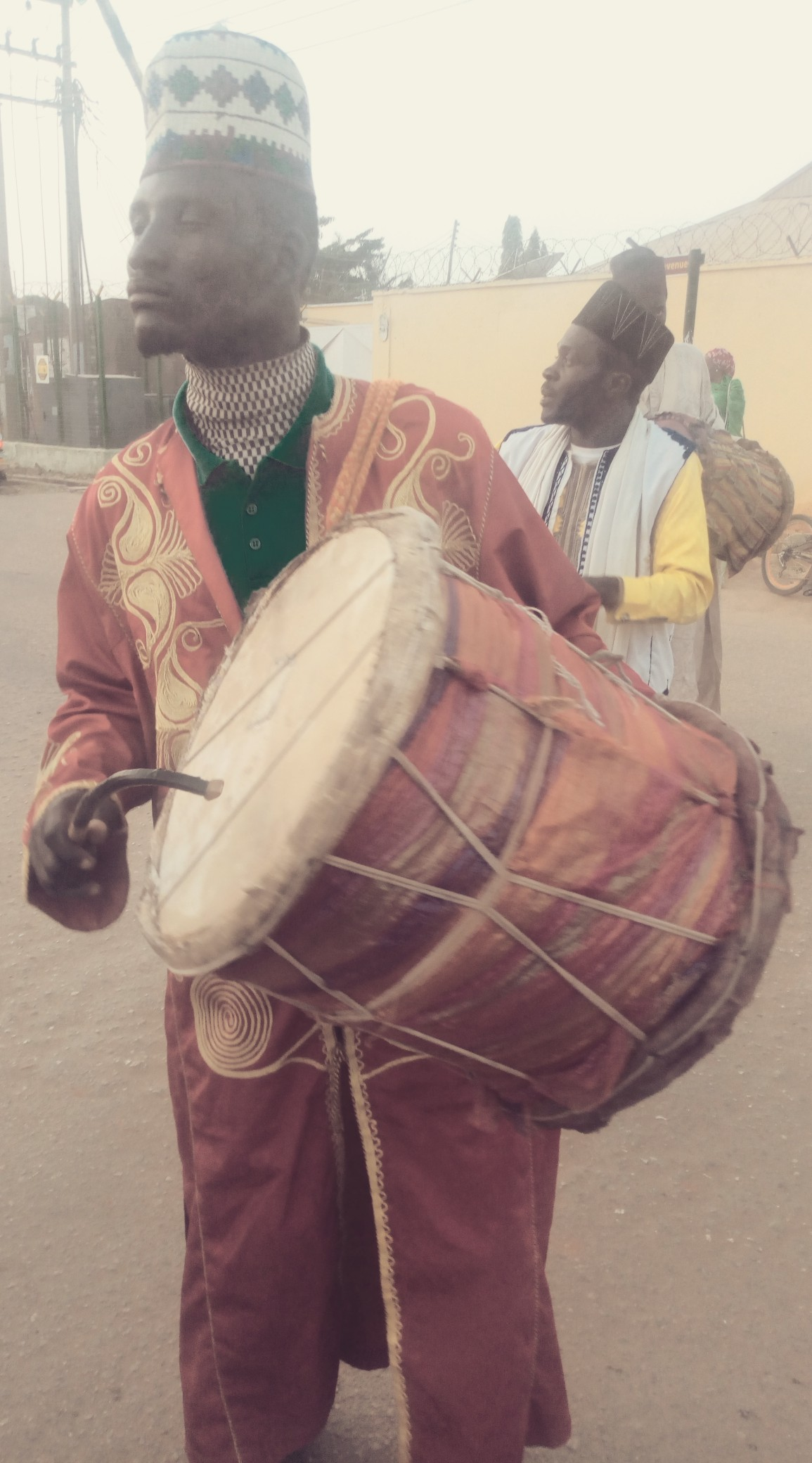
Hausa drummer

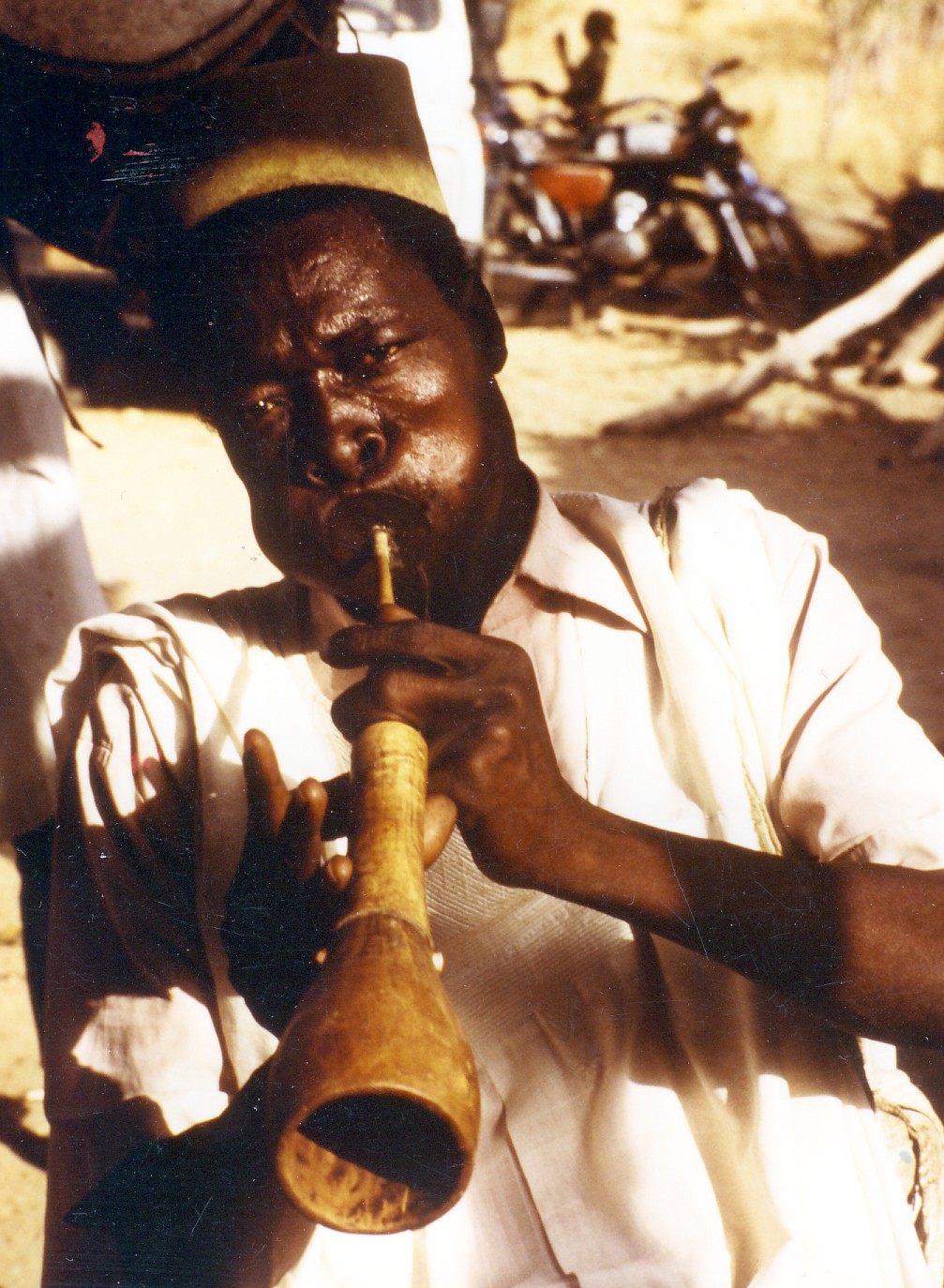
Algaita player, a type of multi-reed instrument like a clarinet or oboe.

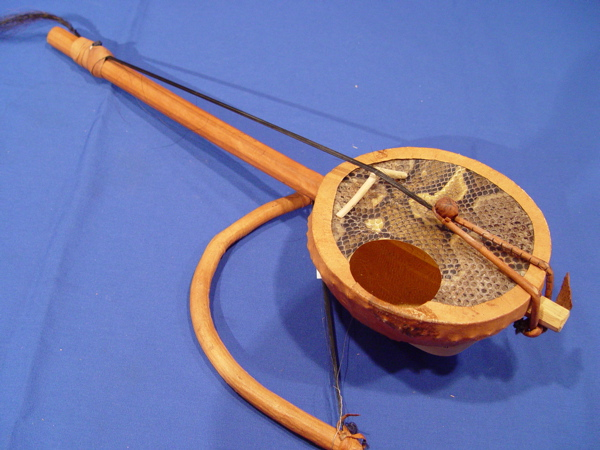
Goje fiddle

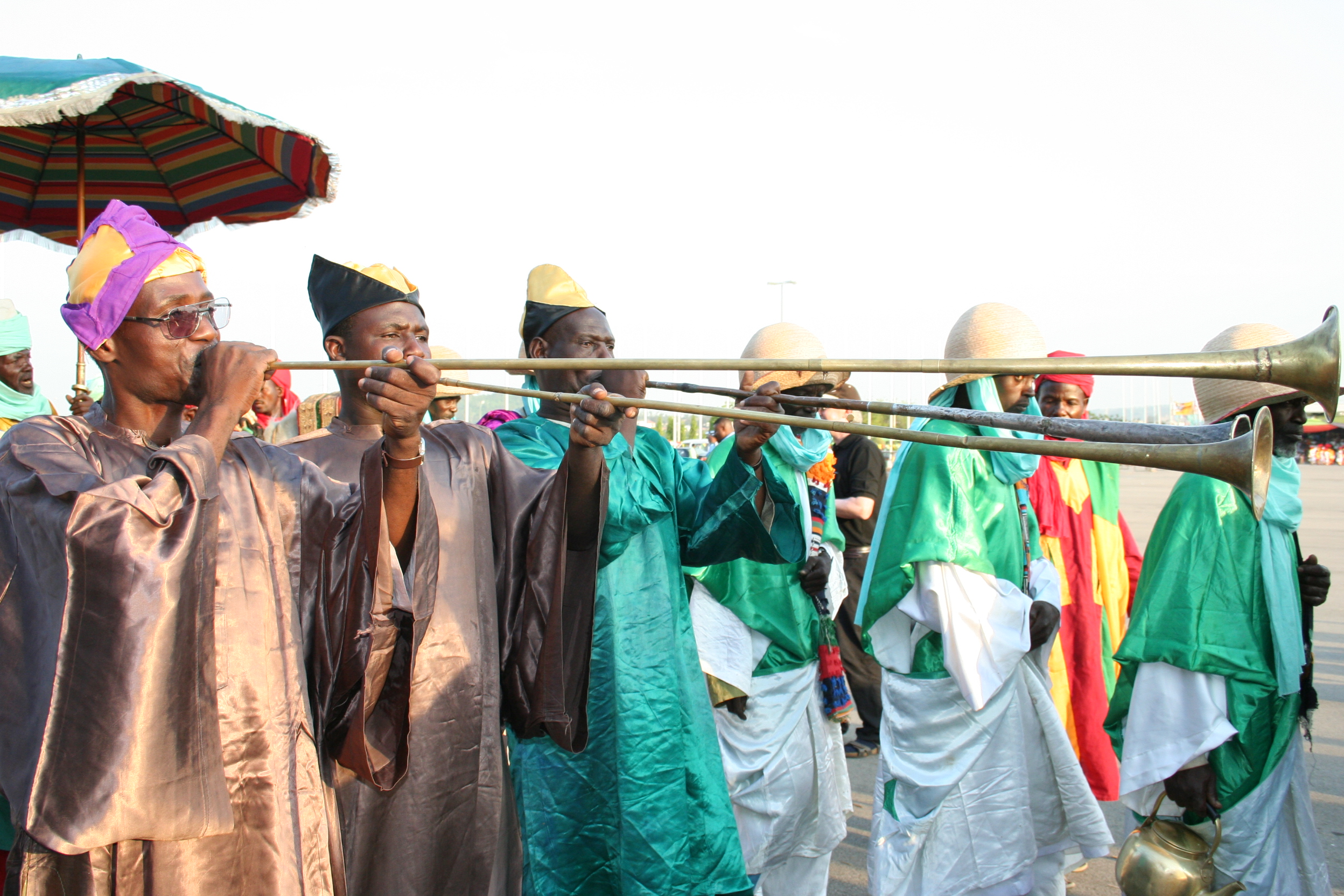
Kakaki trumpet players from Northern Nigeria. The instrument is similar or related to the nafir, an instrument that traveled with Islam.

According to a Y-DNA study by Hassan et al. (2008), about 40.7% of Hausa in Sudan carry the West Eurasian haplogroup R-M173 (R1) with the mutation P25. (Note: P25 is an unreliable genetic marker for which recurrent back-mutations are documented. RP25 might indicate R-V88 (R1b1a2), which is statistically the most common R1 clade in Africa) The remainder belong to various African paternal lineages: 15.6% B-M60 (B), 15.6% E-M33 (E1a), 12.5% A-M13 (A1b1b2b) and 12.5% E-M2 (E1b1a1). One of the 32 tested individuals (3.1%) belonged to E-M78 (E1b1b1a1) (Note: Haplogroup E-M78 (E1b1b1a1) is most common at the Horn of Africa and also frequently occurs in North Africa, East Africa and the Balkans.).

A more recent genetic study of the Hausa population in Arewa (Northern Nigeria) reported similar results, with haplogroup E1b1a being the most prevalent (47%), followed by other subclades of haplogroup E—including E-M33 and E-M75—at 21%. Haplogroup R-M173 (R1) was observed at a frequency of 18%, while haplogroup B accounted for 9% of the sample. Haplogroup E1b1b was present at a lower frequency of 5%. In further detail, the Hausa populations in Kano showed a higher frequency of R1b (approximately 40%), alongside E1b1b at around 20%. These findings indicate substantial paternal lineage diversity among the Hausa, reflecting contributions from West African, North and Eurasian populations.

In terms of overall ancestry, an autosomal DNA study by Tishkoff et al. (2009) found the Hausa to be most closely related to Nilo-Saharan populations from Chad and South Sudan. This suggests that the Hausa and other modern Chadic-speaking populations originally spoke Nilo-Saharan languages, before adopting languages from the Afroasiatic family after migration into that area thousands of years ago:

From K = 5-13, all Nilo-Saharan speaking populations from southern Sudan, and Chad cluster with west-central Afroasiatic Chadic-speaking populations (Fig. S15). These results are consistent with linguistic and archeological data, suggesting a possible common ancestry of Nilo-Saharan speaking populations from an eastern Sudanese homeland within the past ≈10,500 years, with subsequent bi-directional migration westward to Lake Chad and southward into modern day southern Sudan, and more recent migration eastward into Kenya and Tanzania ≈3,000 ya (giving rise to Southern Nilotic speakers) and westward into Chad ≈2,500 ya (giving rise to Central Sudanic speakers) (S62, S65, S67, S74). A proposed migration of proto-Chadic Afroasiatic speakers ≈7,000 ya from the central Sahara into the Lake Chad Basin may have caused many western Nilo-Saharans to shift to Chadic languages (S99). Our data suggest that this shift was not accompanied by large amounts of Afroasiatic16 gene flow. Analyses of mtDNA provide evidence for divergence ≈8,000 ya of a distinct mtDNA lineage present at high frequency in the Chadic populations and suggest an East African origin for most mtDNA lineages in these populations (S100).

A study from 2019 that genotyped 218 unrelated males from the Igbo, Hausa and Yoruba tribes using X-STR analysis, found that when studying the genetic affinity, no significant differences were detected, supporting a genetic homogeneity of Nigerian ethnic groups. In 2024, a paper similarly found homogeneity in the Yoruba, Igbo and Hausa in Nigeria for X-Chromosomes (mtDNA). However, differences in the Hausa were found for the Y-Chromosome, where they had more paternal lineages associated with Afro-Asiatic speakers, while the Yoruba and Igbo were predominantly paternally related to other Niger-Congo speaking groups. Specifically, in the 135 Yoruba and 134 Igbo males, E-M2 was seen at high rates of 90%. In contrast, the 89 Hausa males had E-M2 at 43%, and frequencies for R1b-V88 at 32%, A 9%, E1a 6%, B 5%, and another 5% being made of other lineages—for more comprehensive information.

== Culture ==
The Hausa cultural practices stand unique in Nigeria and have withstood the test of time due to strong traditions, cultural pride as well as an efficient precolonial native system of government. Consequently, and in spite of strong competition from western European culture as adopted by their southern Nigerian counterparts, have maintained a rich and particular mode of dressing, food, language, marriage system, education system, traditional architecture, sports, music and other forms of traditional entertainment.

=== Language ===
A spoken sample of modern Hausa

Though the Hausa language, is a member of the Chadic branch of the Afroasiatic family of languages, linguistic scholars note that it has lost many typical features of Afroasiatic languages in contact with Benue-Congo languages and constitutes a group within itself (Gwandara, the only other member of the group) .The groups most closely related to it, with which Hausa shares many features of phonology and grammar, are the Bole and Angas languages of Nigeria. What sets Hausa apart from its sister languages is the richness of its vocabulary, due in large part to the enormous number of loanwords from neighbouring languages.

Hausa has more first-language speakers than any other African language with around 50 million first-language speakers, and close to 30 million second-language speakers. The main region in which Hausa is spoken is within Nigeria and southern Niger. Hausa is also widely spoken in northern Ghana, Cameroon, Chad, and Ivory Coast as well as among other neighbouring people.

There is a large and growing printed literature in Hausa, which includes novels, poetry, plays, instruction in Islamic practice, books on development issues, newspapers, news magazines, and technical academic works. Radio and television broadcasting in Hausa is ubiquitous in Nigeria and Niger, and radio stations in Cameroon have regular Hausa broadcasts, as do international broadcasters such as the BBC, VOA, Deutsche Welle, Radio Moscow, Radio Beijing, RFI France, IRIB Iran IRIB World Service, and others—for more comprehensive information

Hausa is used as the language of instruction at the elementary level in schools in northern Nigeria, and Hausa is available as course of study in northern Nigerian universities. In addition, several advanced degrees (Masters and PhD) are offered in Hausa in various universities in the UK, US, and Germany.

=== Religion ===
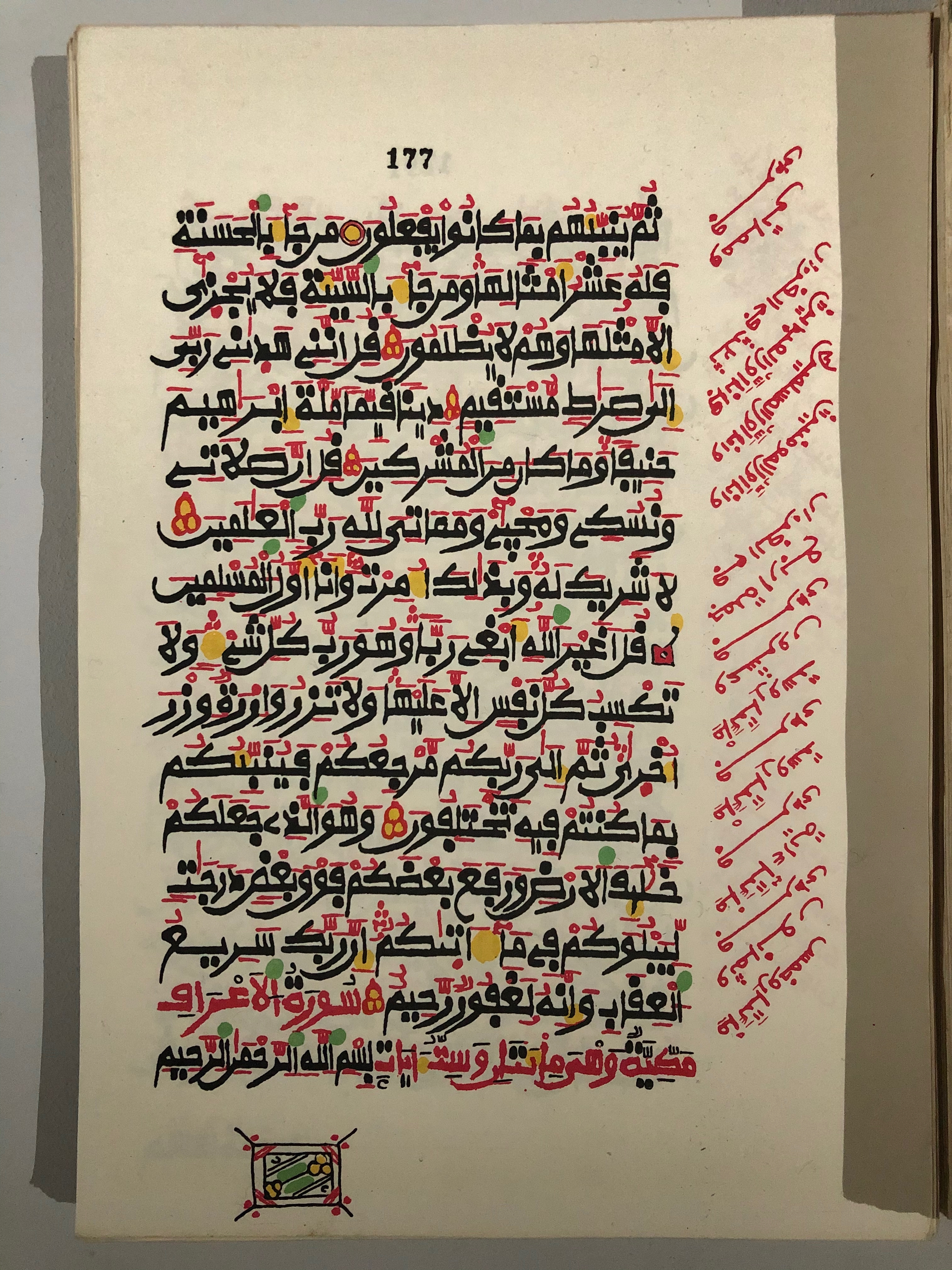
A lithographic print from Nigeria in the early 20th century featuring text from the Surah of An'am, printed in the Hausawi script.

Sunni Islam of the Maliki madhhab, is the predominant and historically established religion of the Hausa people. Islam has been present in Hausaland since as early as the 11th century — giving rise to famous native Sufi saints and scholars such as Wali Muhammad dan Masani (d.1667) and Wali Muhammad dan Marina (d. 1655) in Katsina — mostly among long-distance traders to North Africa whom in turn had spread it to common people while the ruling class had remained largely pagan or mixed their practice of Islam with pagan practices. By the 14th century, Hausa traders were already spreading Islam across a large swathe of west Africa such as Ghana, Côte d'Ivoire, etc..

Muslim scholars of the early 19th century disapproved of the hybrid religion practiced in royal courts. A desire for reform contributed to the formation of the Sokoto Caliphate. The formation of this state strengthened Islam in rural areas. The Hausa people have been an important factor for the spread of Islam in West Africa. Today, the current Sultan of Sokoto is regarded as the traditional religious leader (Sarkin Musulmi) of Sunni Hausa–Fulani in Nigeria and beyond.

Maguzanci, an African Traditional Religion, was practised extensively before Islam. In the more remote areas of Hausaland, the people continue to practise Maguzanci. Closer to urban areas, it is not as common, but with elements still held among the beliefs of urban dwellers. Practices include the sacrifice of animals for personal ends, but it is not legitimate to practise Maguzanci magic for harm. People of urbanized areas tend to retain a "cult of spirit possession," known as Bori. It incorporates the old religion's elements of African Traditional Religion and magic.

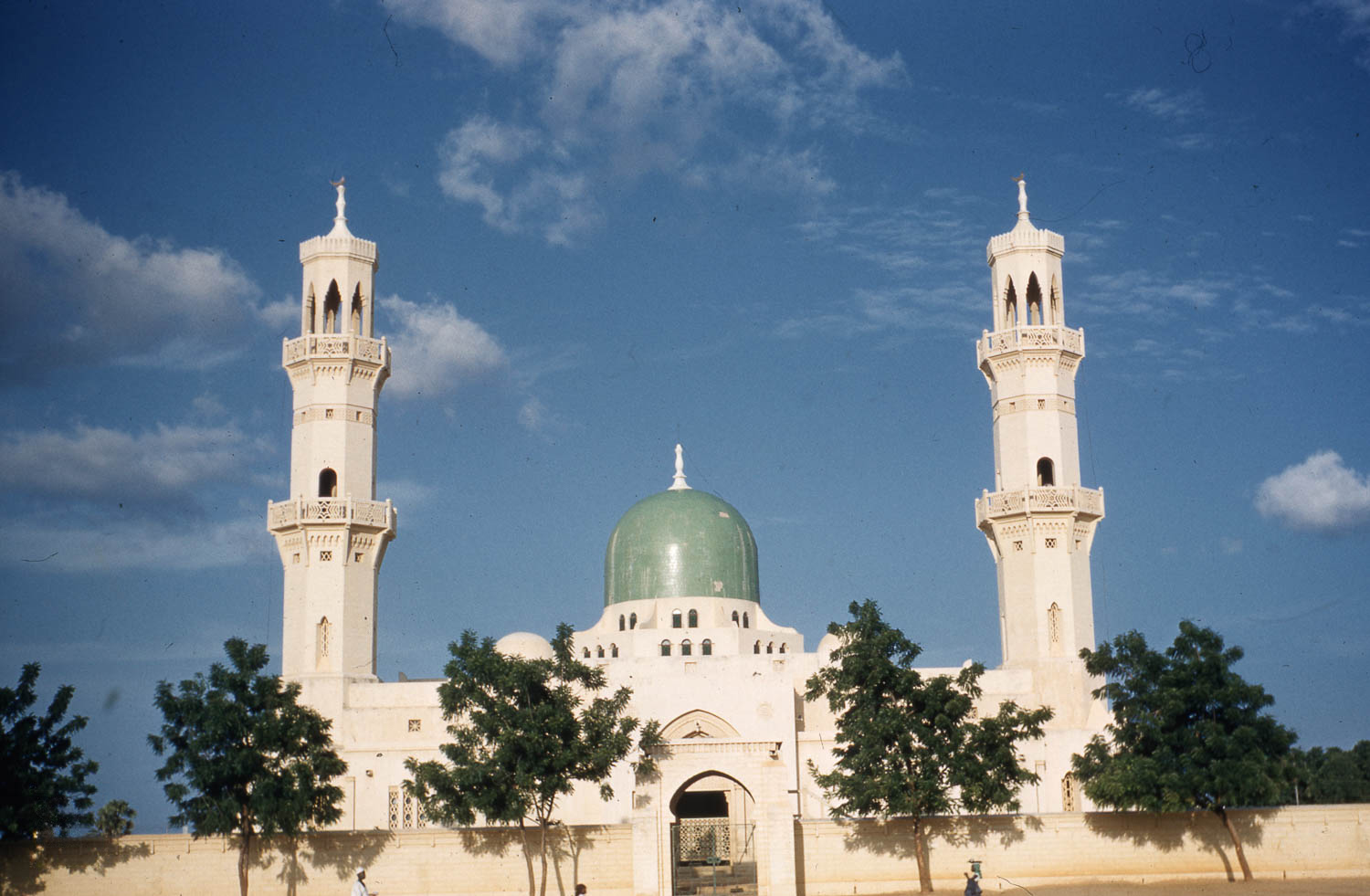
The Great Mosque of Kano in 1960. It is one of the oldest mosques in Nigeria and was built in the 15th century by Muhammad Rumfa, the 21st Sarkin Kano

=== Clothing and accessories ===
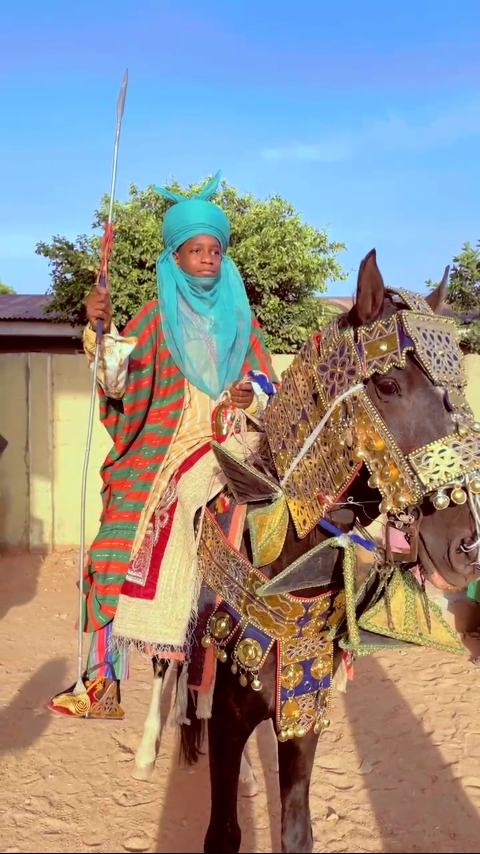
A boy on a horse in a traditional Hausa royalty dress

The Hausa were famous throughout the Middle Ages for their cloth weaving and dyeing, cotton goods, leather sandals, metal locks, horse equipment and leather-working and export of such goods throughout the west African region as well as to north Africa (Hausa leather was erroneously known to medieval Europe as Moroccan leather). They were often characterized by their Indigo blue dressing and emblems that earned them the nickname "bluemen". They traditionally rode on fine Saharan camels and horses. Tie-dye techniques have been used in the Hausa region of West Africa for centuries with renowned indigo dye pits located in and around Kano, Nigeria. The tie-dyed clothing is then richly embroidered in traditional patterns.

The traditional dress of the Hausa consists of loose flowing gowns and trousers. The gowns have wide openings on both sides for ventilation. The trousers are loose at the top and center, but rather tight around the legs. Leather sandals and turbans are also typical. The men are easily recognizable because of their elaborate dress: a large flowing gown known as Babban riga also known by various other names due to adaptation by many ethnic groups neighboring the Hausa (see indigo Babban Riga/Gandora). These large flowing gowns usually feature elaborate embroidery designs around the neck and chest area.

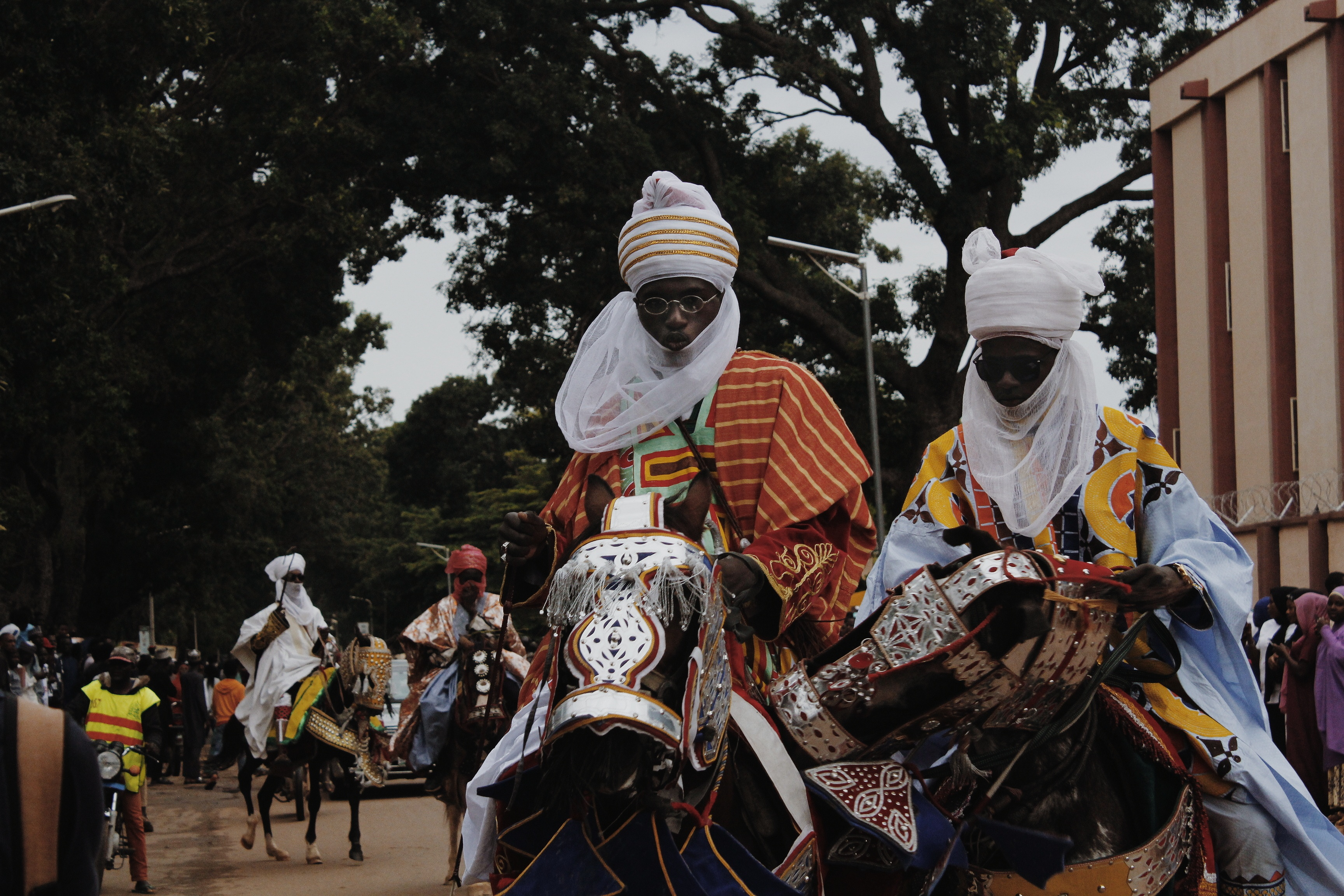
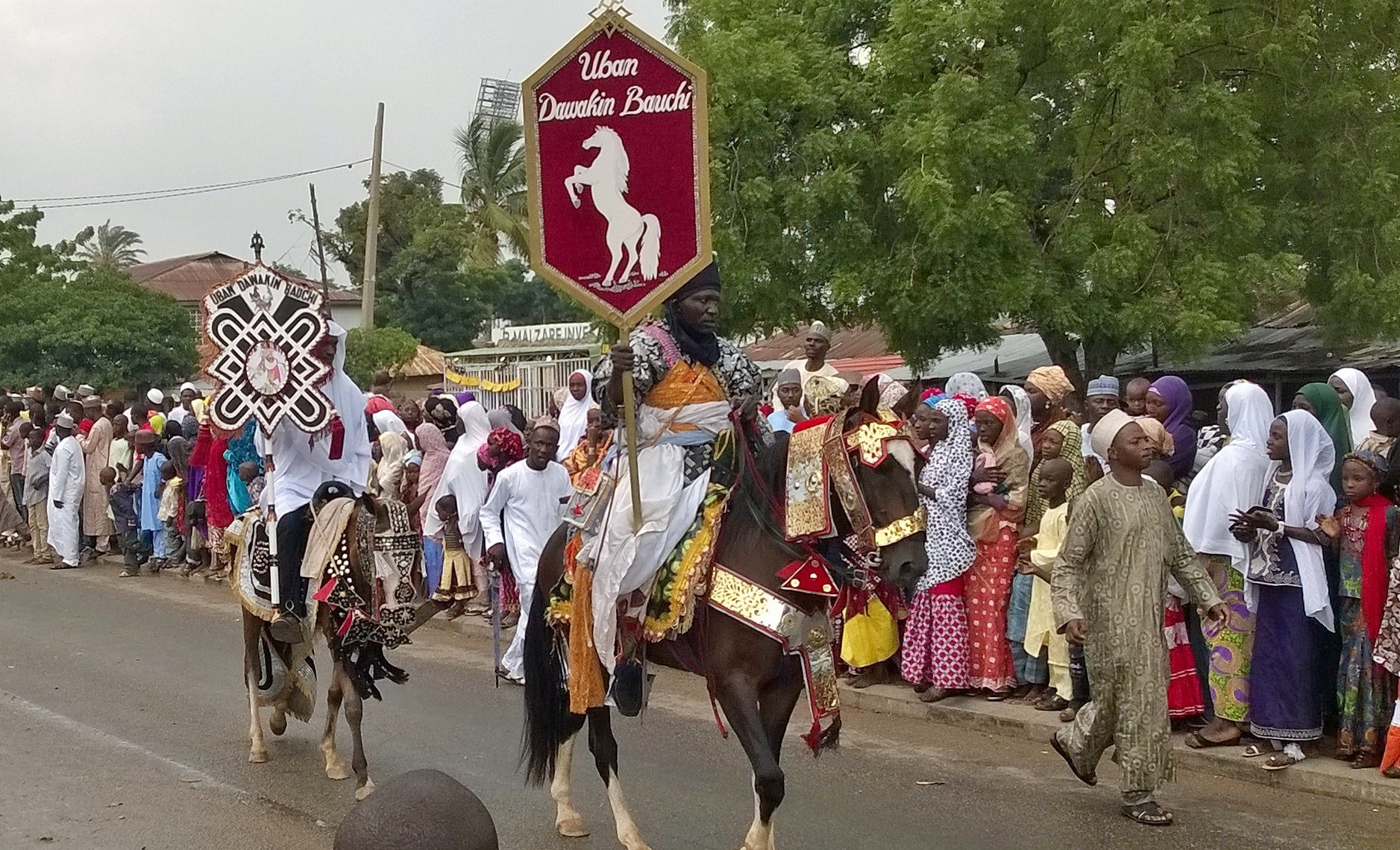
Eid al-Fitr procession in northern Nigeria

They also wore a type of shirt called tagguwa (long and short slip from fula term taggore). The oral tradition regarding the tagguwa is that during the age when Hausawa were using leaves and animal skin to cover their private parts, a man called Guwa decided to cut the centre of the animal skin and wear it like a shirt instead of just covering his privates. People around to Guwa became interested in his new style and decided to copy it. They called it 'Ta Guwa', meaning "similar to Guwa". It eventually evolved to become Tagguwa.

Men also wear colourful embroidered caps known as hula. Depending on their location and occupation, they may wear the turban around this to veil the face, called Alasho. The women can be identified by wrappers called zani, made with colourful cloth known as atampa or Ankara, (a descendant of early designs from the famous Tie-dye techniques the Hausa have for centuries been known for, named after the Hausa name for Accra the capital of what is now Ghana, and where an old Hausa speaking trading community still lives) accompanied by a matching blouse, head tie (kallabi) and shawl (Gyale).

Like other Muslims and specifically Sahelians within West Africa, Hausa women traditionally use Henna (lalle) designs painted onto the hand instead of nail-polish. A shared tradition with other Afro-Asiatic speakers like Berbers, Habesha, (ancient) Egyptians and Arab peoples, both Hausa men and women use kohl ('kwalli') around the eyes as an eye shadow, with the area below the eye receiving a thicker line than that of the top. Also, similar to Berber, Bedouin, Zarma and Fulani women, Hausa women traditionally use kohl to accentuate facial symmetry. This is usually done by drawing a vertical line from below the bottom lip down to the chin. Other designs may include a line along the bridge of the nose, or a single pair of small symmetrical dots on the cheeks.

Common traditional dressing in Hausa men

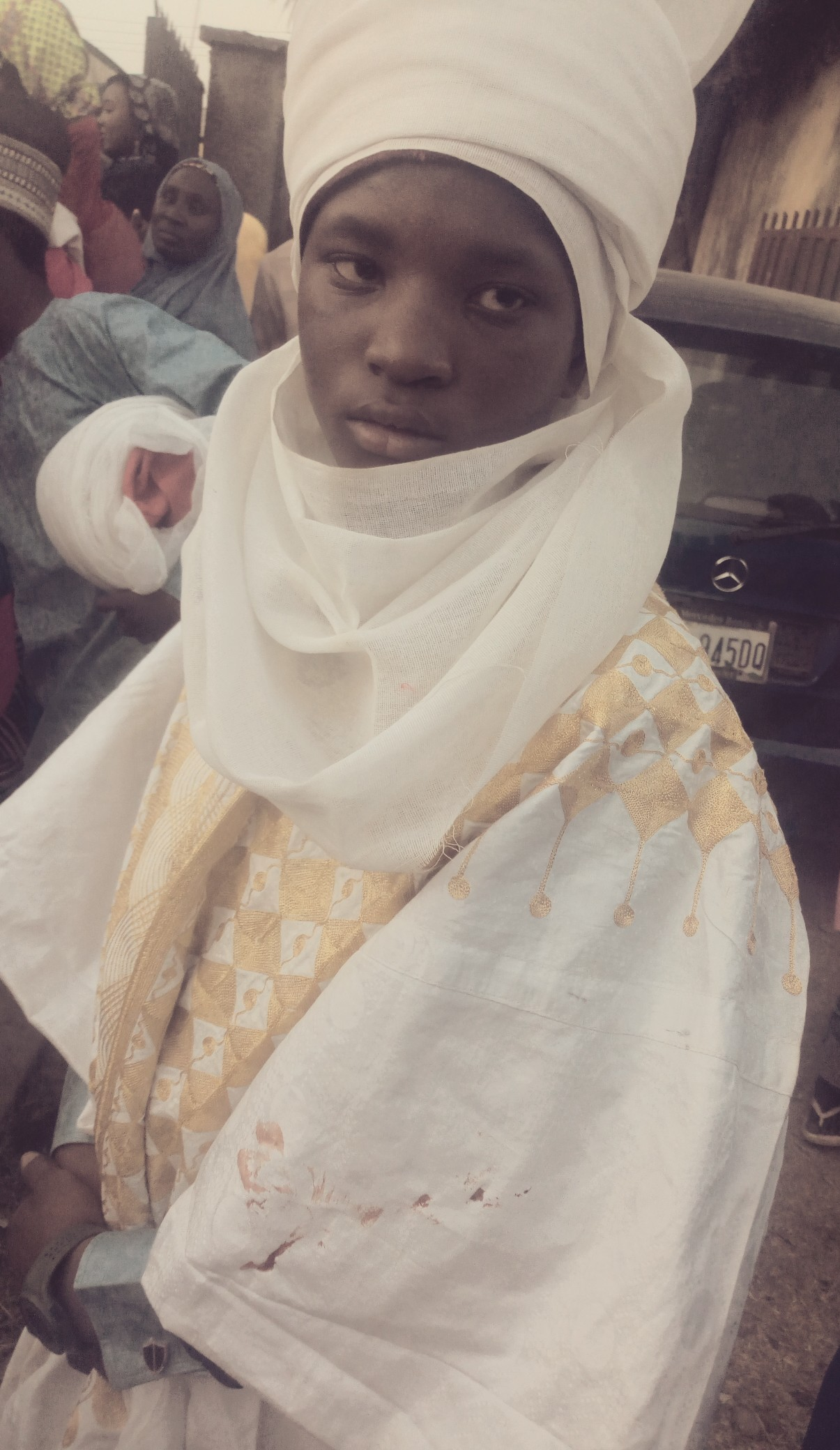
A Hausa boy wearing traditional cloths (Babban riga and rawani)

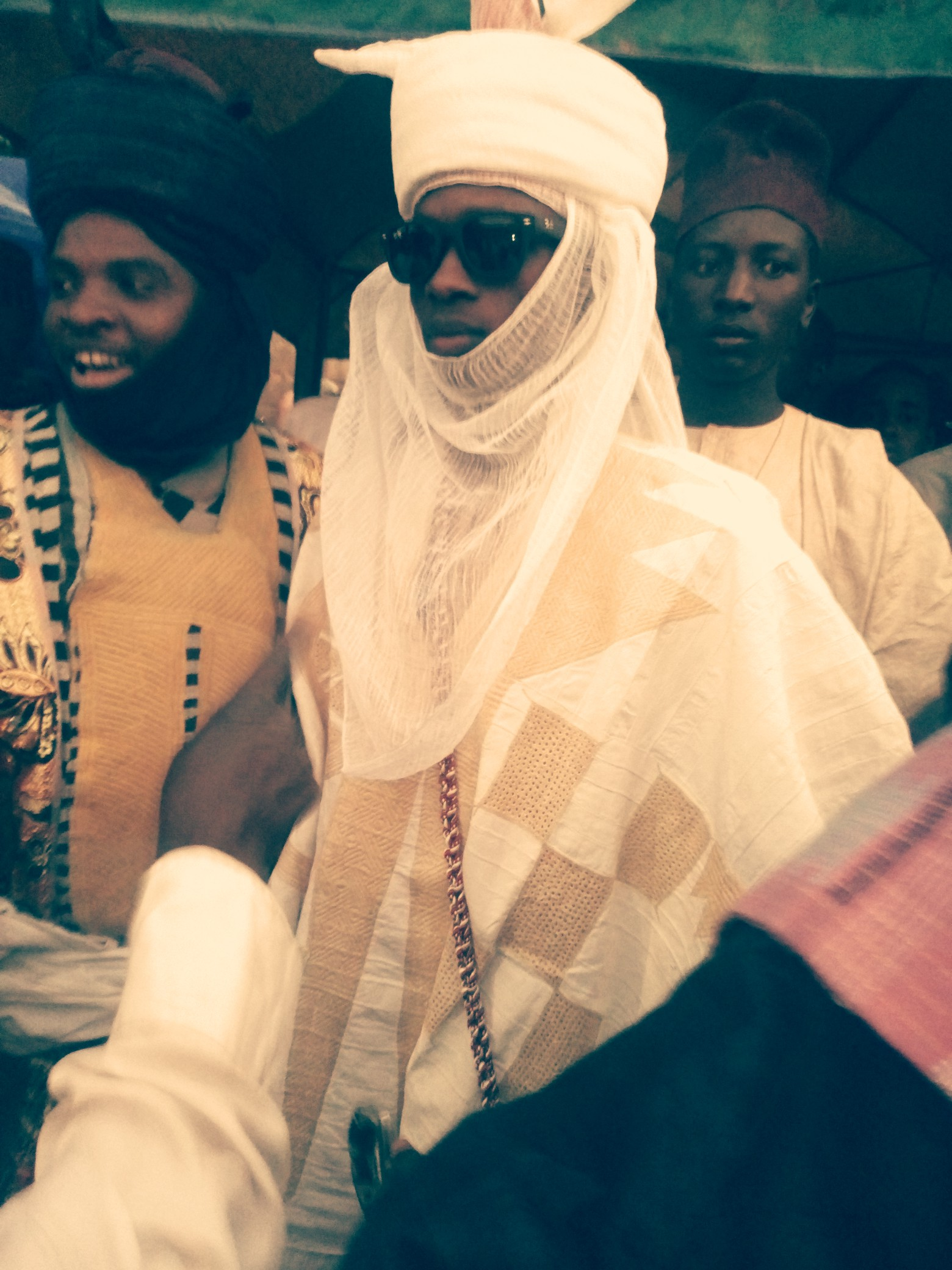
A teenage Hausa boy wearing traditional cloths

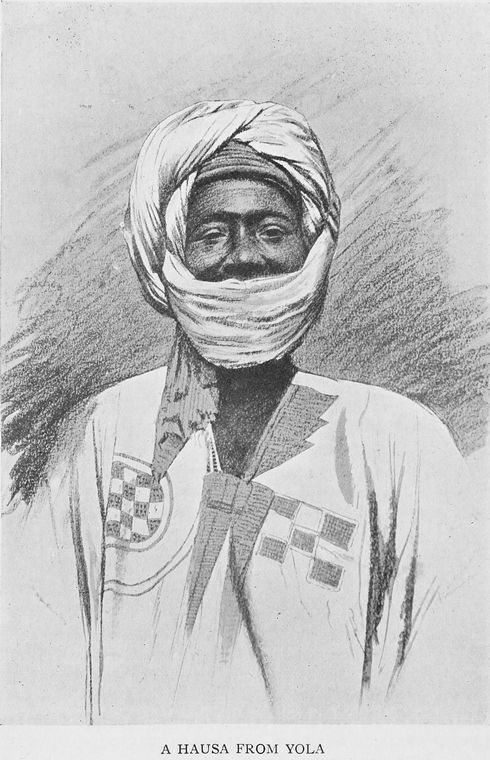
An adult Hausa man in Babban riga and Alasho

Common modern dressing in Hausa women

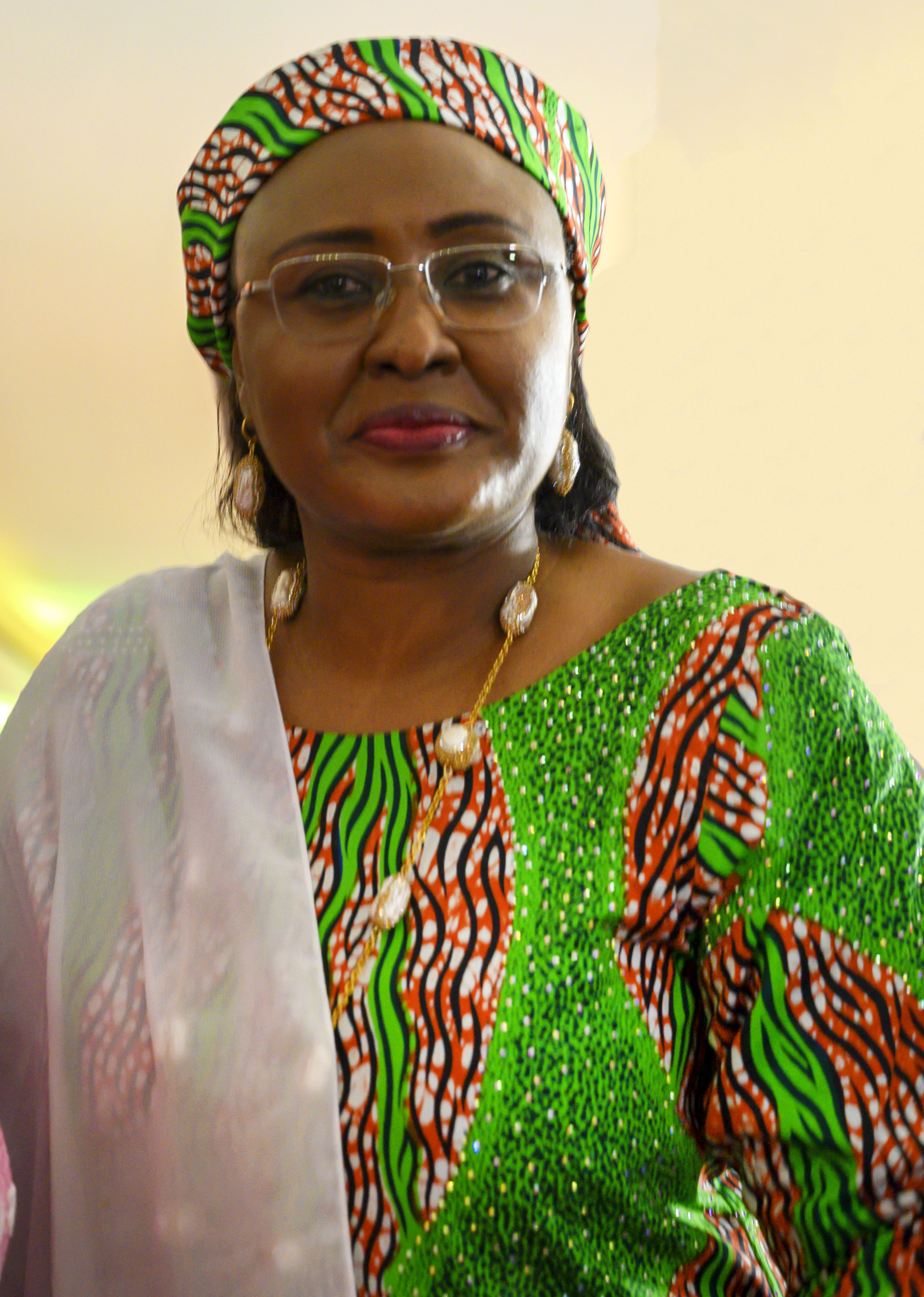
Aisha Buhari wearing Hausa clothes and hijab, which consists of the kallabi matching the dress cloth design, and gyale draped over the shoulder or front

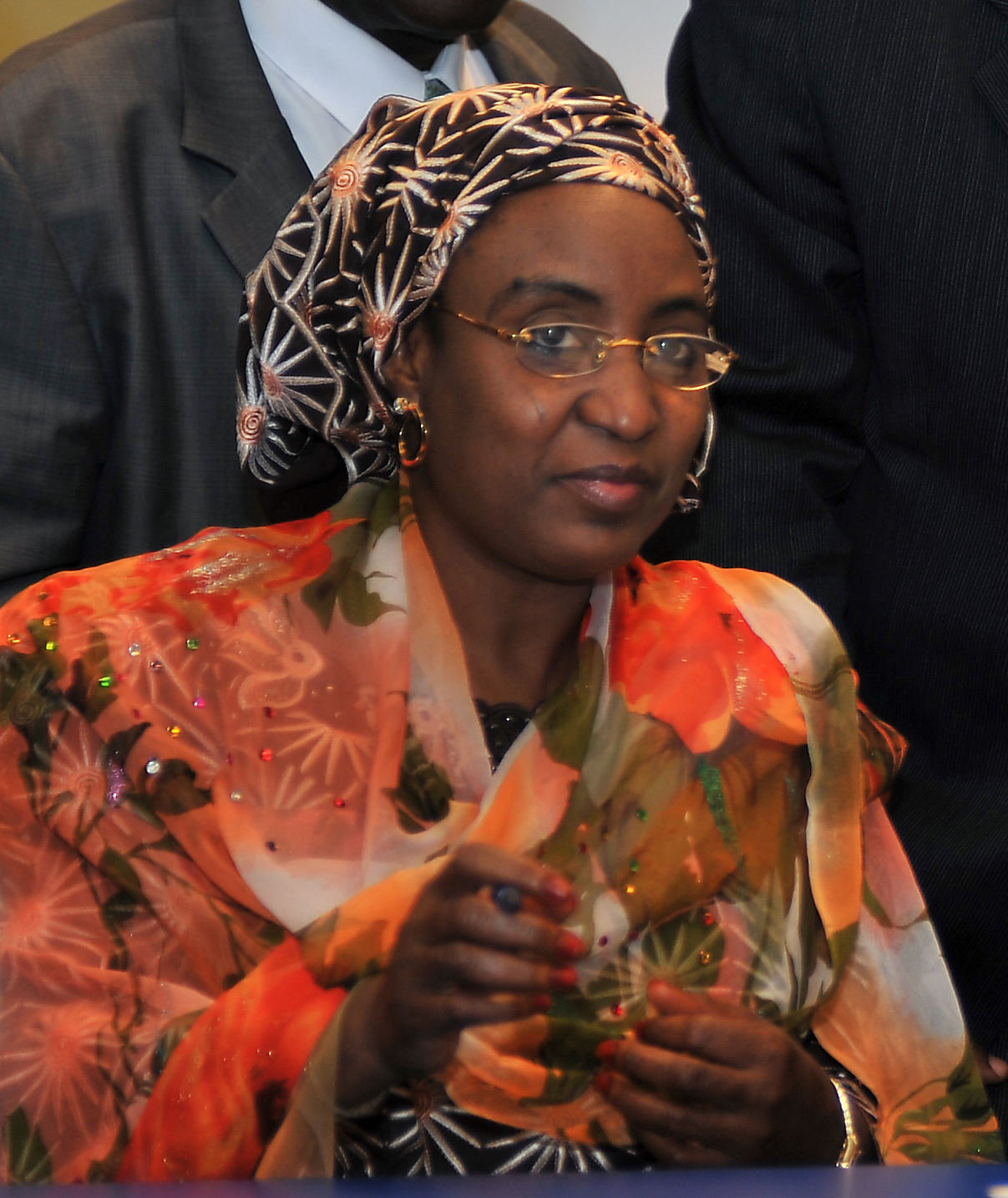
Turai Yar'adua wearing atampa and dan kwali, note the henna designs on the fingertips instead of nail polish

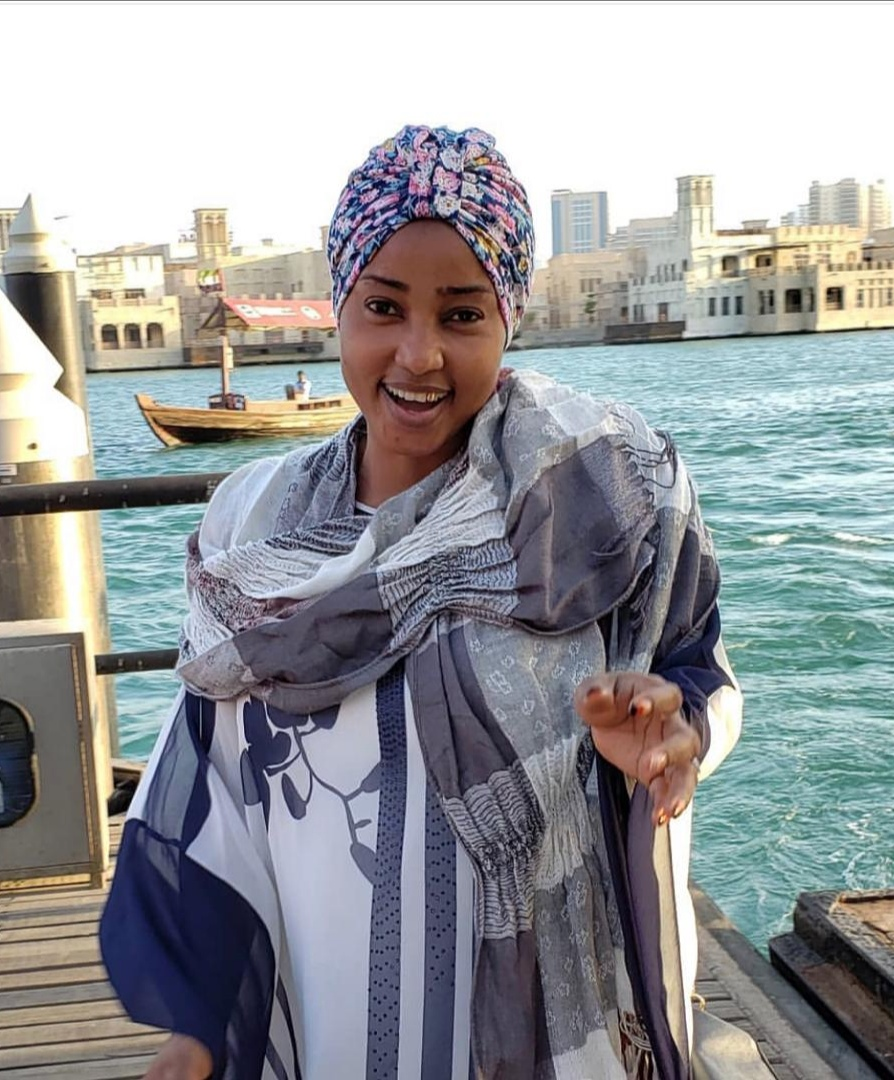
Kannywood actress wearing gyale in Hausa style, along with henna applied on fingers

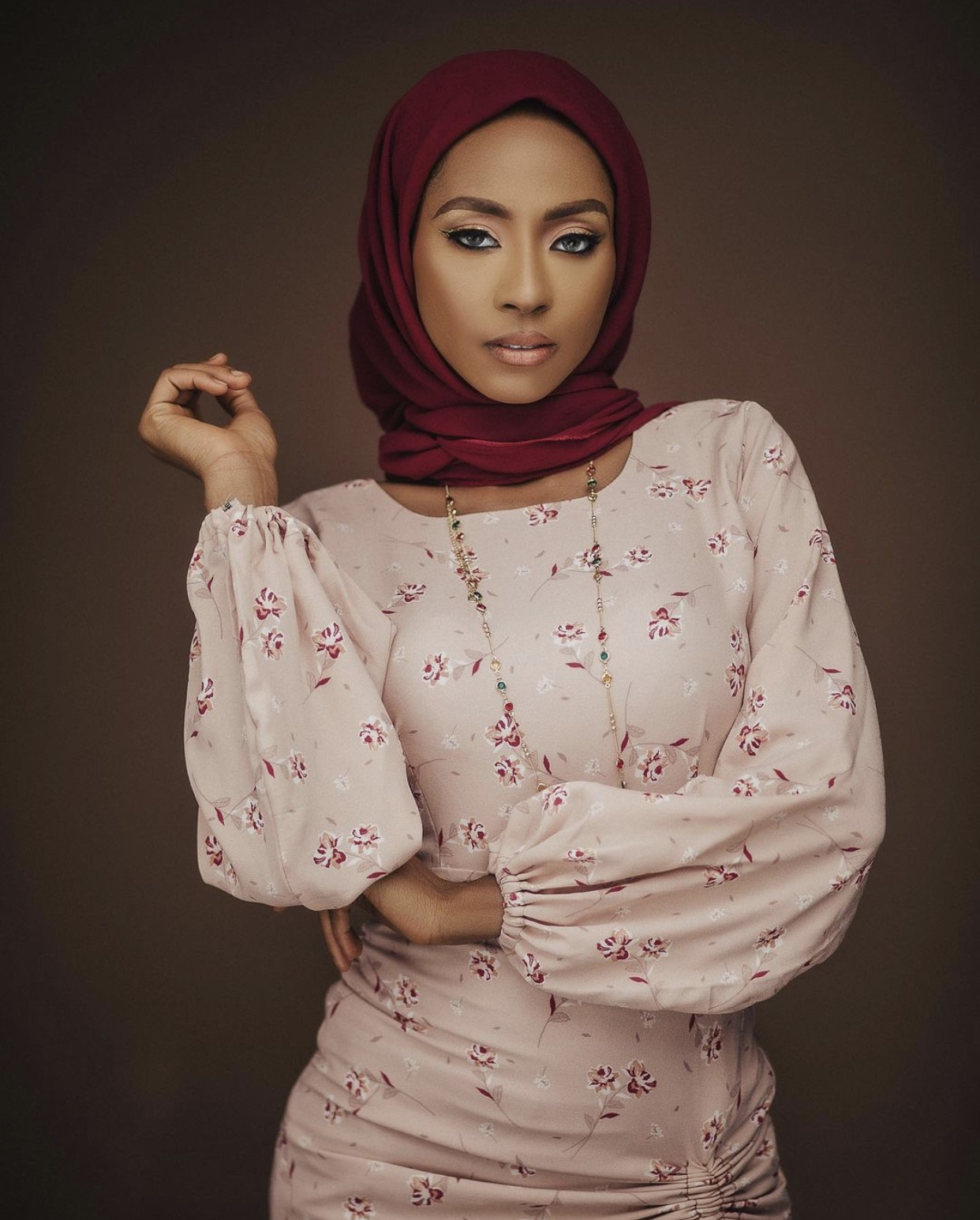
Maryam Booth, Kannywood actress

=== Architecture ===
Many of their early mosques and palaces of the Hausa are bright and colourful, including intricate engraving or elaborate symbols designed into the facade. This architectural style is known as Tubali, which means architecture in the Hausa language. The ancient Kano city walls were built in order to provide security to the growing population. The foundation for the construction of the wall was laid by Sarki Gijimasu from 1095 through 1134 and was completed in the middle of the 14th century. In the 16th century, the walls were further extended to their present position. The gates are as old as the walls and were used to control movement of people in and out of the city. Hausa buildings are characterized by the use of dry mud bricks in cubic structures, multi-storied buildings for the social elite, the use of parapets related to their military/fortress building past, and traditional white stucco and plaster for house fronts. At times the facades may be decorated with various abstract relief designs, sometimes painted in vivid colours to convey information about the occupant.

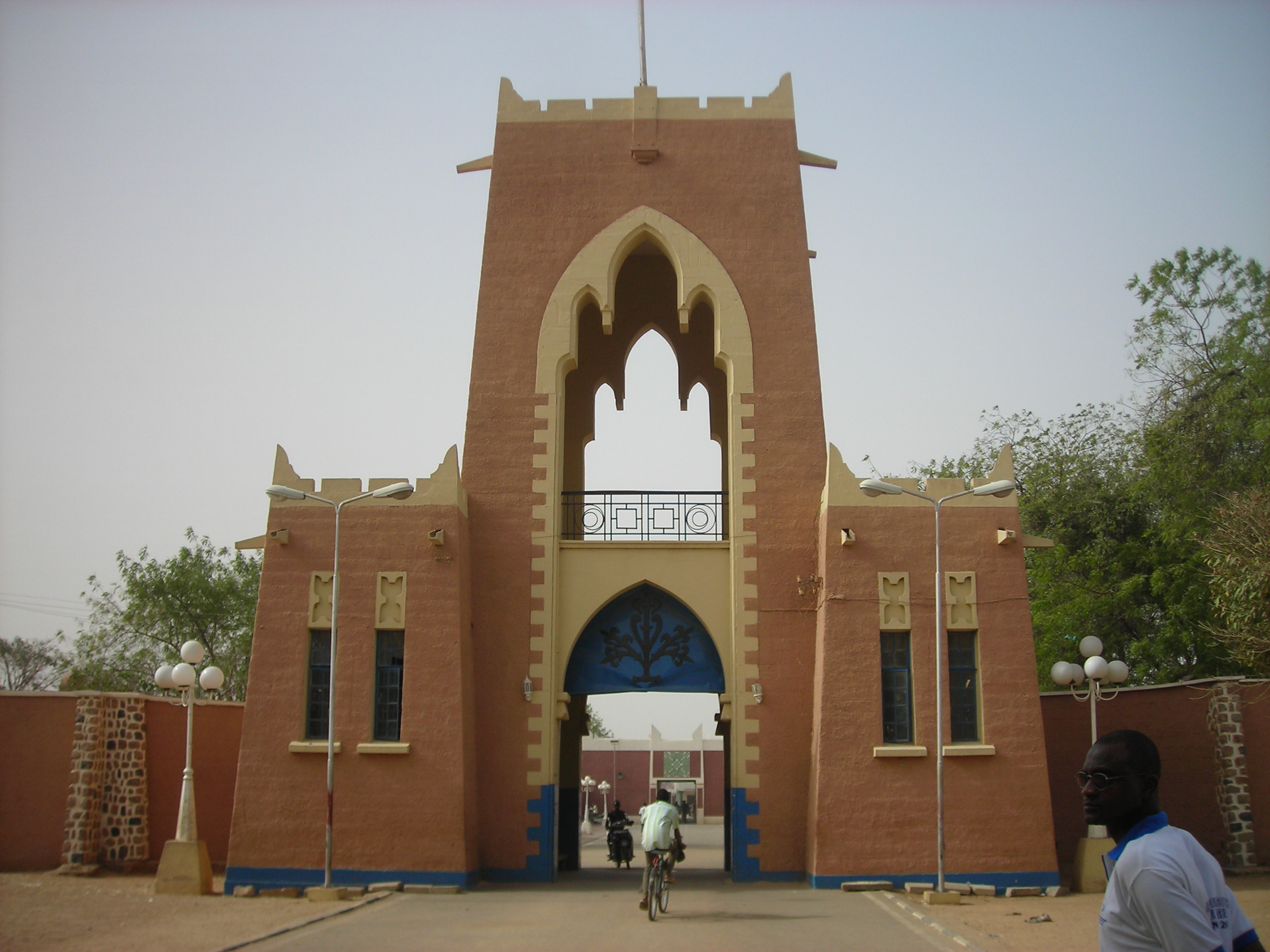
Gate of Kano Emir's Palace (gidan Rumfa)

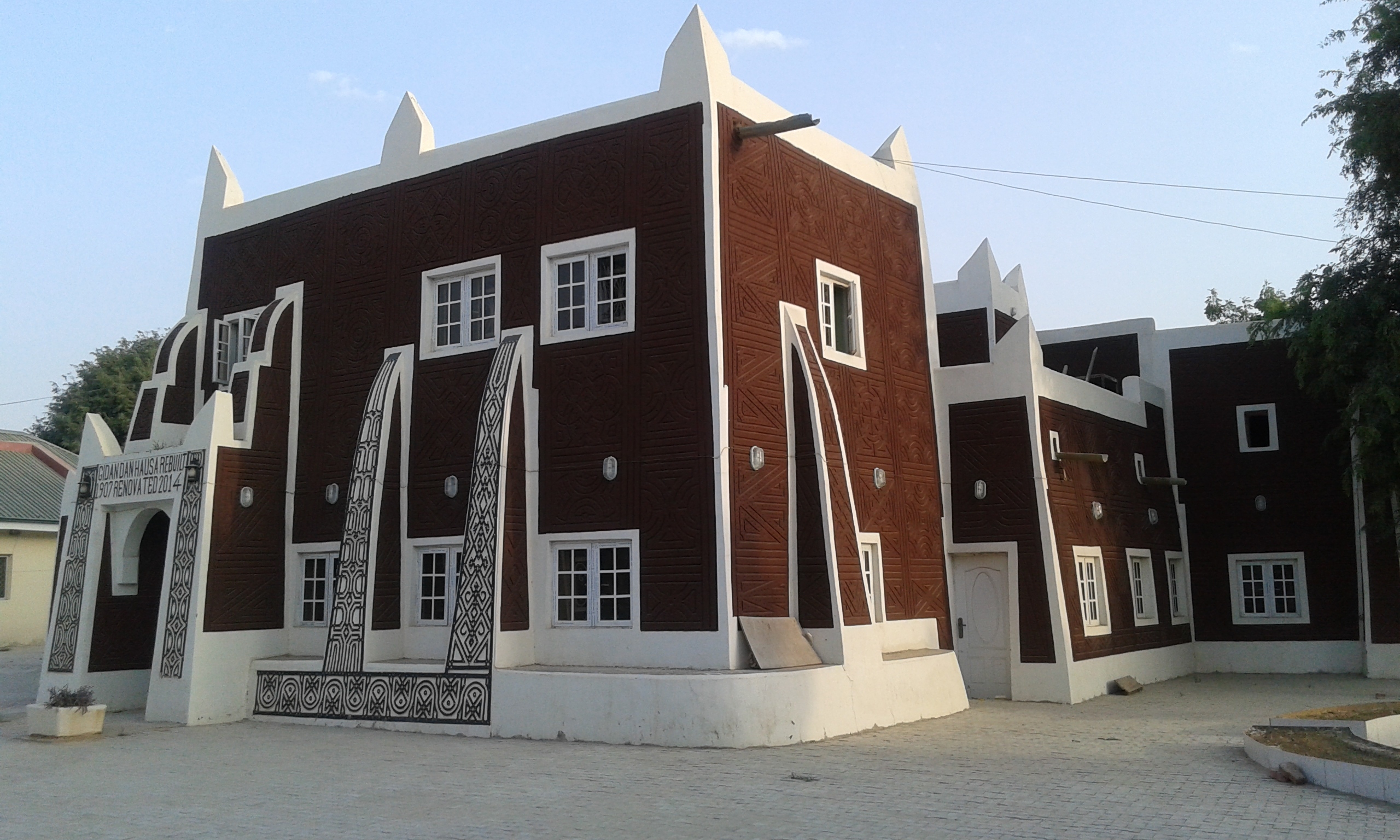
Kano Museum

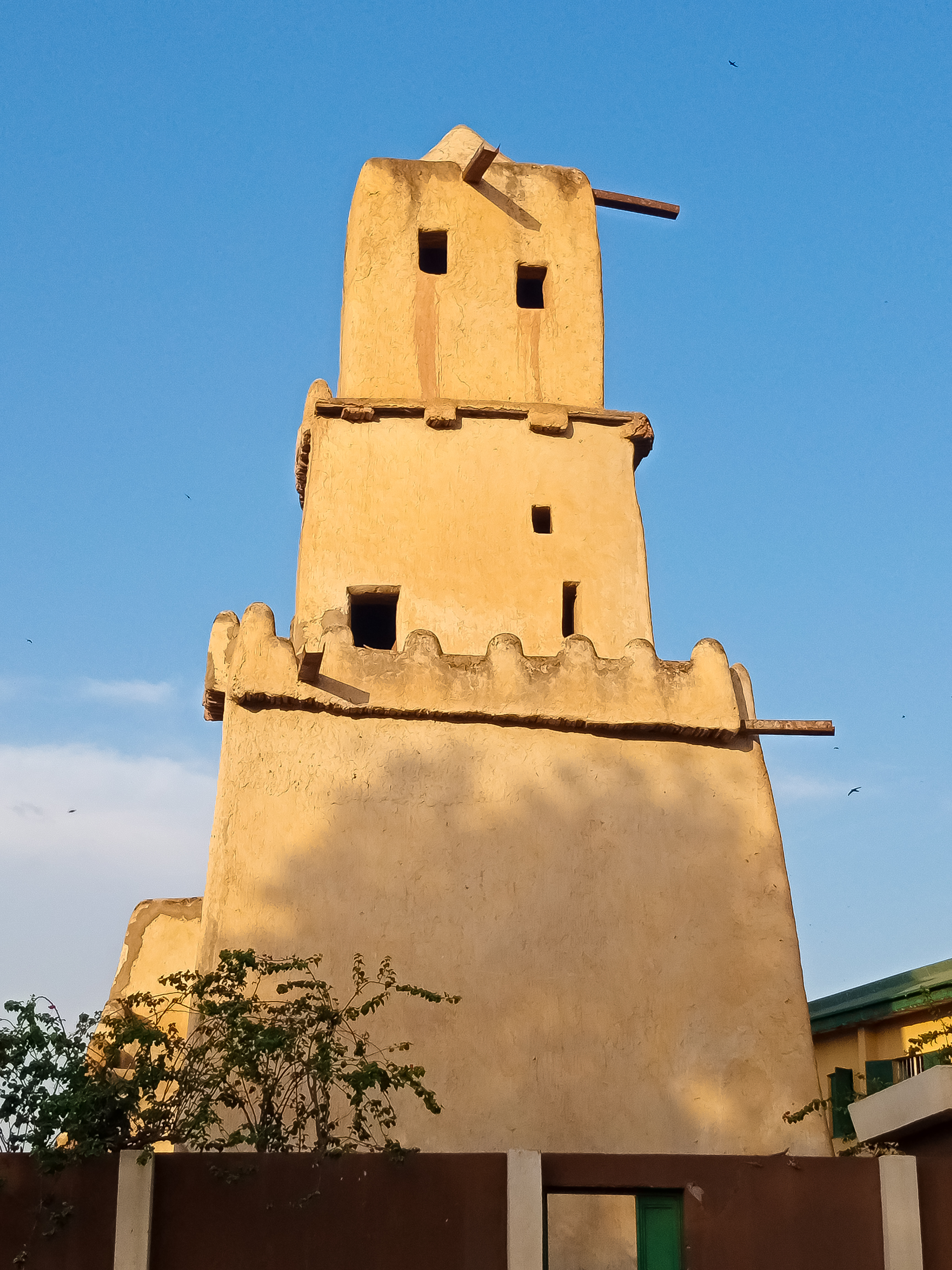
The ancient Gobirau minaret in Katsina

House built in 1959. Photo taken in Agadez, Niger (1997)

Gate to the palace of the Emir of Zaria (1962)

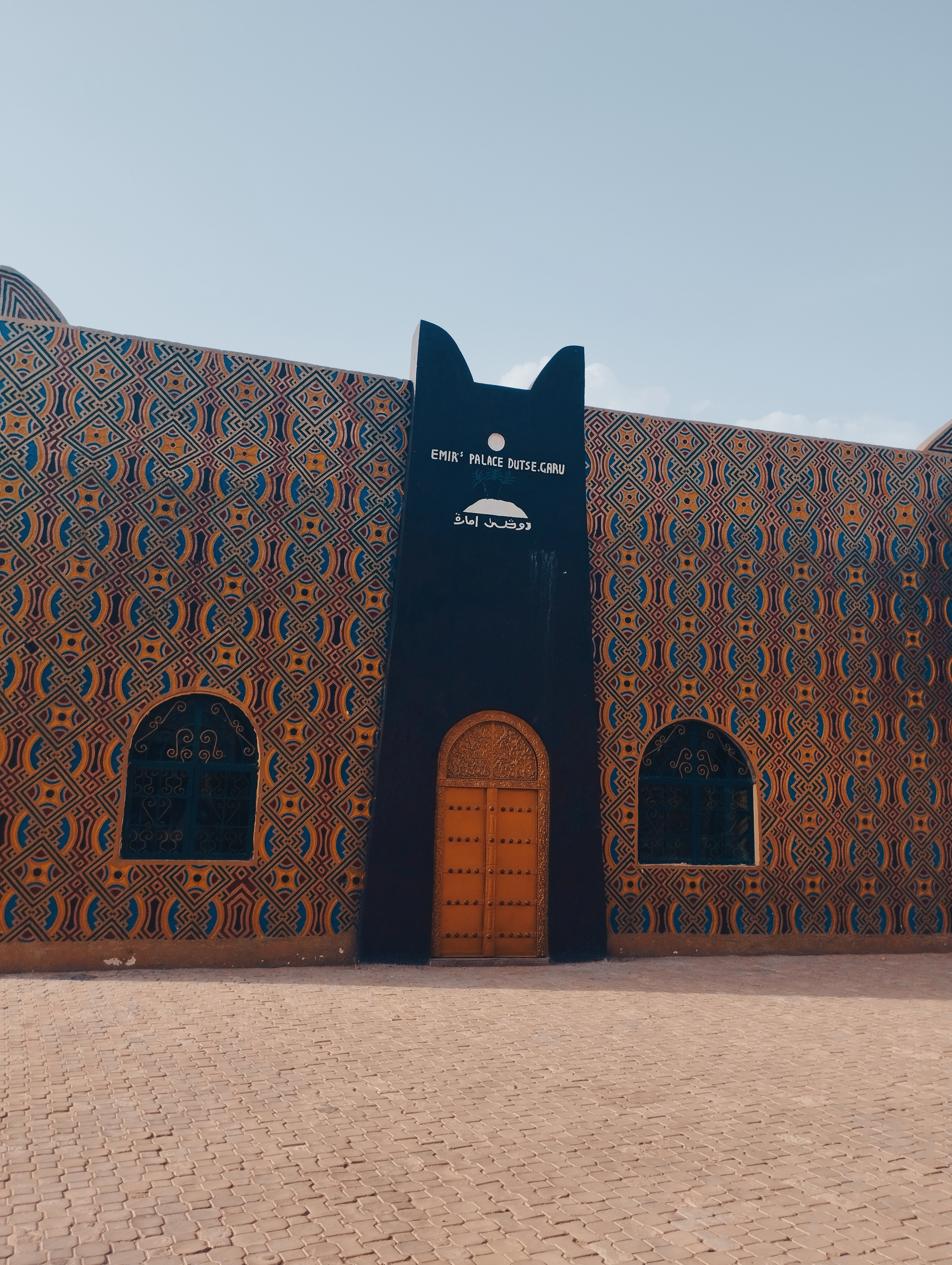
Palace of the Emir of Dutse

=== Sport ===
The Hausa culture is rich in traditional sporting events such as boxing (Dambe), stick fight (Takkai), wrestling (Kokowa) etc. that were originally organized to celebrate harvests but over the generations developed into sporting events for entertainment purposes.

==== Dambe ====
Dambe is a brutal form of traditional martial art associated with the Hausa people of West Africa. Its origin is shrouded in mystery. Edward Powe, a researcher of Nigerian martial art culture, recognizes striking similarities in stance and single wrapped fist of Hausa boxers to images of ancient Egyptian boxers from the 12th and 13th dynasties.

It originally started out among the lower class of Hausa butcher caste groups and later developed into a way of practicing military skills and then into sporting events through generations of Northern Nigerians. It is fought in rounds of three or less that have no time limits. A round ends if an opponent is knocked out, a fighter's knee, body or hand touch the ground, inactivity or halted by an official.

Dambe's primary weapon is the "spear", a single dominant hand wrapped from fist to forearm in thick strips of cotton bandage that is held in place by knotted cord dipped in salt and allowed to dry for maximum body damage on opponents, while the other arm, held open, serve as the "shield" to protect a fighter’s head from their opponent's blows or used to grab an opponent. Fighters usually end up with split brows, broken jaws and noses or even sustain brain damage. Dambe fighters may receive money, cattle, farm produce or jewelry as winnings but generally it was fought for fame from representations of towns and fighting clans.

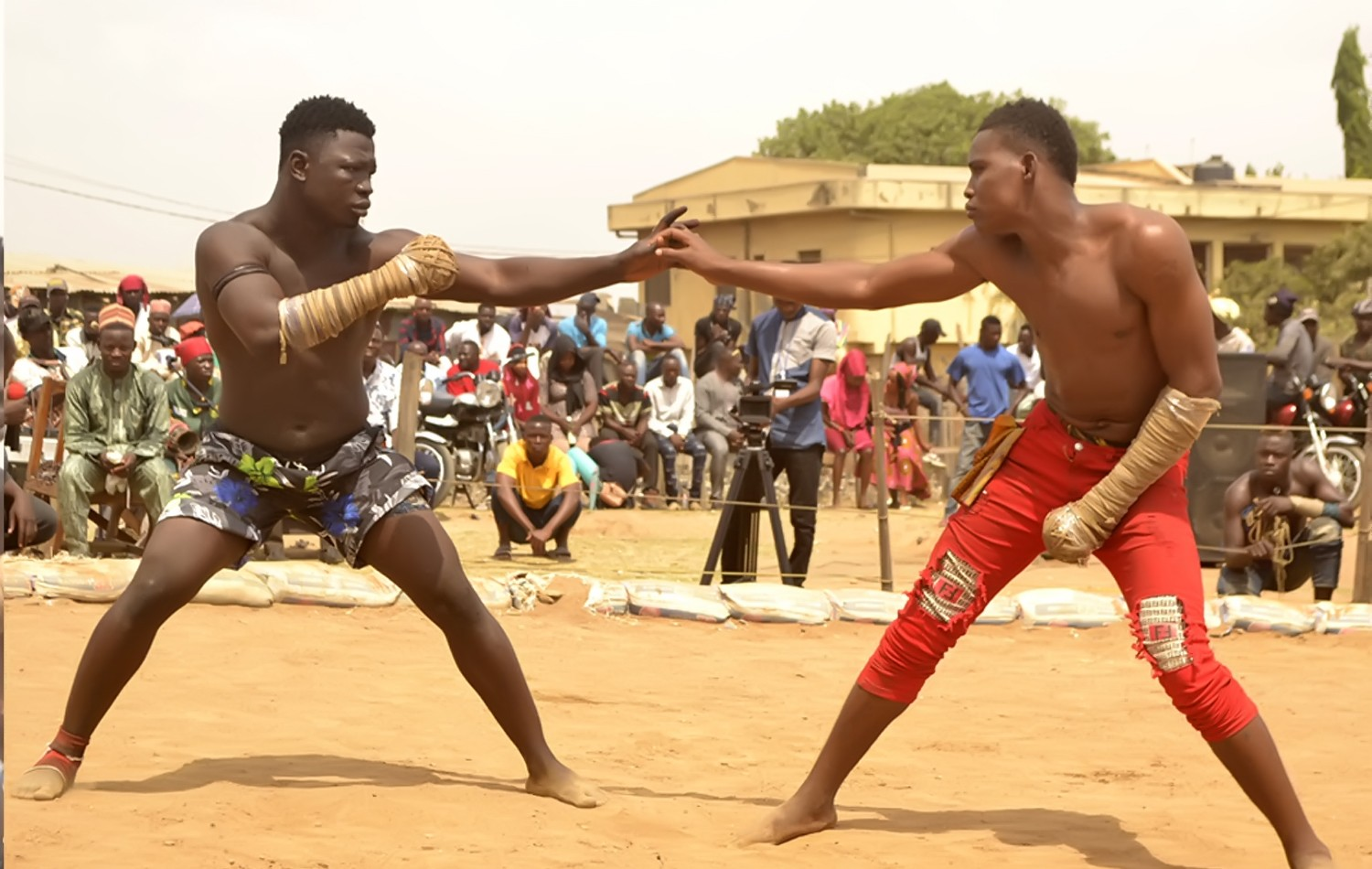
Hausa traditional boxing called Dambe

=== Food ===
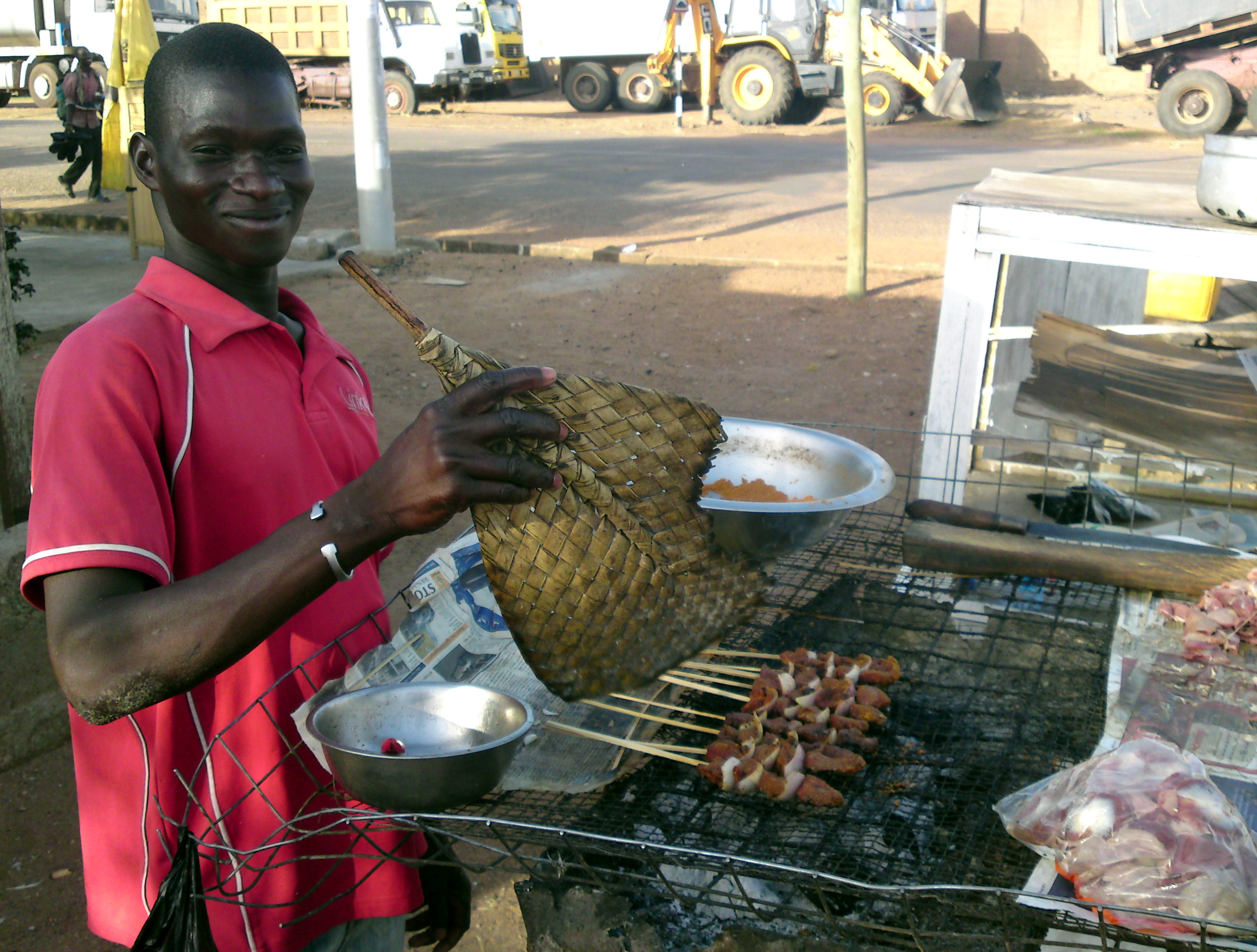
Kyinkyinga (suya), a popular marinated kebab, prepared by a Ghanaian Hausa street vendor in Ghana

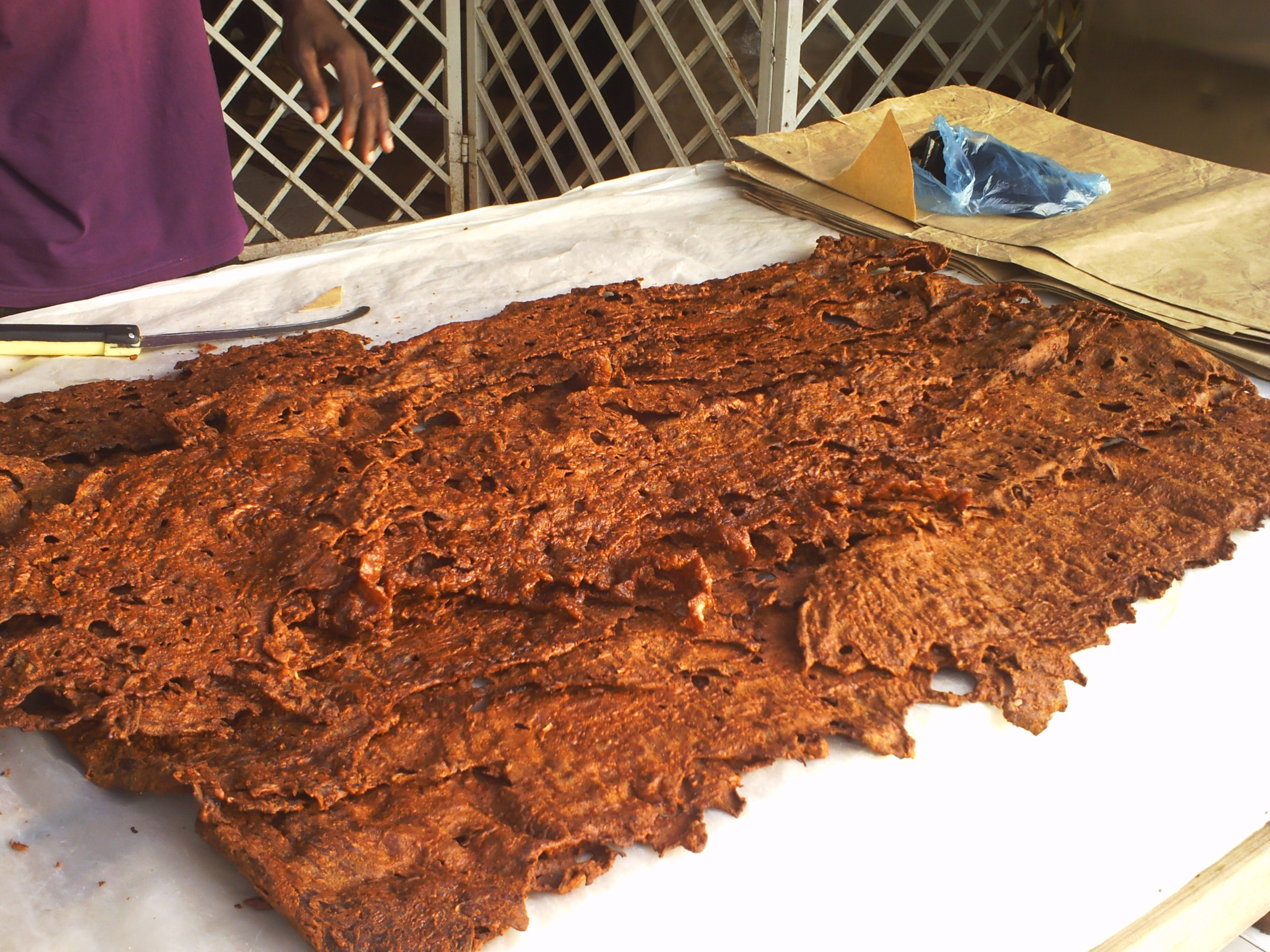
Kilishi, a Hausa delicacy similar to jerky

The most common food that the Hausa people prepare consists of grains, such as sorghum, millet, rice, or maize, which are ground into flour for a variety of different kinds of dishes. This food is popularly known as tuwo in the Hausa language.

Usually, breakfast consists of cakes and dumplings made from ground beans and fried, known as kosai; or made from wheat flour soaked for a day, fried and served with sugar or chili, known as funkaso. Both of these cakes can be served with porridge and sugar known as kunu or koko. Lunch or dinner usually feature a heavy porridge with soup and stew known as tuwo da miya. The soup and stew are usually prepared with ground or chopped tomatoes, onions, and local spices.

Spices and other vegetables, such as spinach, pumpkin, or okra, are added to the soup during preparation. The stew is prepared with meat, which can include goat or cow meat, but not pork, due to Islamic food restrictions. Beans, peanuts, and milk are also served as a complementary protein diet for the Hausa people.

The most famous of all Hausa food is most likely suya, also known as tsire, a peanut and chili-spiced skewered meat dish that is a popular food item in various parts of Nigeria and is enjoyed as a delicacy in much of West Africa and has become a prominent feature of Nigerian food in the diaspora.

A dried version of Suya is called Kilishi.

=== Literature ===
Hausa Language has been written in modified Arabic script, known as Ajami, since pre-colonial times. The earliest Hausa Ajami manuscript with reliable date is the Ruwayar Annabi Musa by the Kano scholar Abdullah Suka, who lived in the 1600s. This manuscript may be seen in the collection of the Jos Museum. Other well-known scholars and saints of the Sufi order from Katsina, Danmarina and Danmasani have been composing Ajami and Arabic poetry from much earlier times also in the 1600s. Gradually, increasing number of Hausa Ajami manuscripts were written, which increased in volume through the eighteenth and nineteenth centuries and continuing into the twentieth century. With the nineteenth century witnessing even more impetus due to the Usman dan Fodio Islamic reform, himself a copious writer who encouraged literacy and scholarship, for both men and women, as a result of which several of his daughters emerged as scholars and writers. Ajami book publishing today has become greatly surpassed by romanized Hausa, or Boko, publishing.

A modern literary movement led by female Hausa writers has grown since the late 1980s when writer Balaraba Ramat Yakubu came to popularity. In time, the writers spurred a unique genre known as Kano market literature — so named because the books are often self-published and sold in the markets of Nigeria. The subversive nature of these novels, which are often romantic and family dramas that are otherwise hard to find in the Hausa tradition and lifestyle, have made them popular, especially among female readers. The genre is also referred to as littattafan soyayya, or "love literature."

=== Hausa symbolism ===
A "Hausa ethnic flag" was proposed in 1966 (according to online reports dated 2001). It shows five horizontal stripes—from top to bottom in red, yellow, indigo blue, green, and khaki beige. An older and traditionally established emblem of Hausa identity, the 'Dagin Arewa' or Northern knot, in a star shape, is used in historic architecture, design and embroidery.

=== Sexuality and gender roles ===
Same-sex relations and gender roles are documented among the Hausa, with feminine men known as yan daudu constituting a recognised subculture within Hausa society. Yan daudu men are cross-dressers who have sex with other men and engage in social activities that are typically done by females. However, they are often still married to women and have children.

== See also ==
- Hausa architecture
- Hausa animism
- Hausa Day
- Hausa language
- Hausa Kingdoms
- Hausa music
- List of Hausa people

== Bibliography ==
- Bivins, Mary Wren (2007). Telling Stories, Making Histories: Women, Words, and Islam in Nineteenth-Century Hausaland and the Sokoto Caliphate. Social History of Africa. Portsmouth, New Hampshire: Heinemann. ISBN 9780325070131. OCLC 77821635.
- Haour, Anne; Rossi, Benedetta, eds. (2010). Being and Becoming Hausa: Interdisciplinary Perspectives. African Social Studies Series. Leiden; Boston: Brill. ISBN 9789004185425.
- Liman, Abubakar Aliyu (February 2019). "Memorializing a Legendary Figure: Bayajidda the Prince of Bagdad in Hausa Land". Afrika Focus 32.1: 125–136.
- Philips, John Edward (2004). "Hausa in the Twentieth Century: An Overview". Sudanic Africa, vol. 15: Language in Africa. pp. 55–84. JSTOR 25653413. On the language of the people.
- Salamone, Frank A. (2010). The Hausa of Nigeria. Lanham, MD: University Press of America. ISBN 9780761847243.
