= Nura Hussain =

Nigerian actor and director (born 1974)

- Born: Nura Hussain; 15 May 1978 (age 47); Kano, Nigeria
- Occupation: Actor
- Years active: 1997–present

Nura Hussain, known as Ya Sayyadi (born 15 May 1978) is a veteran actor in the Hausa-language film industry known as Kannywood. He gained prominence through his role in the historical film Bayajidda, and is recognized for portraying calm, scholarly characters. In addition to acting, he is also a film producer and a businessman.

== Personal life ==
Hussain is married to Aisha Bello Bagudu, and they have seven children—four daughters and three sons.

== Early life and education ==
Nura Hussain was born on May 15, 1978, in Yakasai Quarters, Kano Municipal, Kano State, Nigeria. He is the third of twelve children born to his father, Mallam Hussain who migrated from N'Djamena, Republic of Chad, a religious scholar, and his mother, Malama Ummu Kulthum Muhammad.

Hussain began his primary education at Yolawa Islamic School in 1981, later transferring to Shahuci Judicial Islamic School, where he studied until 1991. He continued his education at Wawure Junior Secondary School (1992–1995), then attended Government Arabic Teachers College Gwale for one year before completing his secondary education at Alliya Senior Secondary School (1995–1997). He later earned a diploma in Civil Law from the School of Legal Studies, Kano (2000–2003).

== Career in Film ==
Hussain entered the film industry in 1997 with his debut role in Zarge, where he played the character “Ya Sayyadi.” His performance earned him respect and recognition, leading to more roles. Inspired by the film Kara da Kiyashi, he joined Tauraruwa Drama Group and was later invited by producer Auwalu Muhammad Sabo to act in Sarauniya, alongside the late actress Hauwa Ali Dodo.

He has since featured in and produced numerous films, including Bayajidda, Zarge, Sangaya, Linzami da Wuta, Farin Wata, Lokaci, Da Kishiyar Gida, Halin Mutum Jarin Sa and Tsakaninmu.

He owns a production company called N.H. Production, through which he has produced over 200 films. After a brief hiatus, he returned to the industry and continues to contribute.

== Controversy ==
On 14 October 2025, Nura Hussain became a subject of public attention following a petition filed against him with the Kano State Police Command by his close associate, Zubairu Dalhatu Malami over alleged defamation and threats to his life.

Hussain was arrested on charges of defamatory and threatening acts allegedly committed between 2018 and 2025. He was involved in the circulation of false statements designed to tarnish the image of his accuser to his family members, business partners, and associates. He was also accused of spreading the same through Facebook and Instagram posts, as well as direct WhatsApp messages, one of which, he claimed, threatened to destroy Mr. Malami's life and wealth.
