= Bassa, Plateau State =

Bassa
- LGA and Town
- Interactive map of Bassa
- Location in Nigeria
- Coordinates: 10°05′N 8°44′E
- Country: Nigeria
- State: Plateau State

Government
  - Local Government Chairman: Joshua Sunday Riti

Area
  - Total: 1,743 km^{2} (673 sq mi)

Population (2006 census)
  - Total: 186,859
  - Density: 107.2/km^{2} (277.7/sq mi)
- Time zone: UTC+1 (WAT)
- 3-digit postal code prefix: 930
- ISO 3166 code: NG.PL.BA

Bassa is a town and Local Government Area in the north of Plateau State, Nigeria, bordering Kaduna and Bauchi States.

It has an area of 1,743 km^{2} with other small towns like Miango, Mc Alley; originally called Biciza, Jengre, villages such as Binchin, Zukku, Kwal, Saya, Gurum among many others and a population of 186,859 at the 2006 census. Bassa local government houses the Nigerian Army 3 Division, Maxwell Khobe Cantonment as well as a police station and the First bank of Nigeria.

The postal code of the area is 930.

== Languages ==
Languages spoken in Bassa are Rigwe, Timap, Ce, Buji– Boze, Atsam, Zele, Baw, T'kurmi, Lemoro, Shakara, Sanga, Tijanji, Tunzuii and Zora. Hausa and English are also widely spoken.

== Festivals ==
Some festivals in Bassa Local Government Area; Remeze – Buji, Azarachi festival of Irigwe, Irigwe New Year Celebration, Anchoncho– a hunting festival of the Bache (Rukuba) people, Amo new-year celebration.

== Climate/Geography ==
The rainy season in Bassa is warm, humid, and cloudy, whereas the dry season is hot and partially cloudy. The average annual temperature is between 12 °C (54 °F) and 33 °C (92 °F); it rarely falls below 9 °C (48 °F) or rises above 36 °C (97 °F). With an average daily high temperature of 32 °C (89 °F), the hot season spans 2.6 months, from February 7 to April 25. At an average high temperature of 32 °C (90 °F) and low temperature of 19 °C (66 °F), April is the hottest month of the year in Bassa.

With an average daily high temperature of less than 26 °C (79 °F), the chilly season spans 2.9 months, from July 5 to October 2. December is the coldest month of the year in Bassa, with typical highs and lows of 29 °C (85 °F) and 13 °C (55 °F), respectively.

With a total area of 1743 square kilometres or 673 square miles, Bassa LGA has two distinct seasons: the rainy and the dry. The region's average temperature is reported to be 29 degrees Celsius or 84 degrees Fahrenheit, with a humidity level of 45 percent.

== Food ==
Bassa people are very rich in agriculture. As a result, they are able to produce and prepare the following traditional foods such as moimoi, Kpewe – This is prepared with Acha and beans, Tinni – It is cooked with Millet, Beni seed and beans as the major ingredients, Kambar – from sweet potatoes, gwote, water yam etc. They plant Irish potatoes, sweet potatoes, maize, tamba as well as soya beans.

== Notable people ==
- Lois Ihwo
