= Kauru =

- LGA and Town
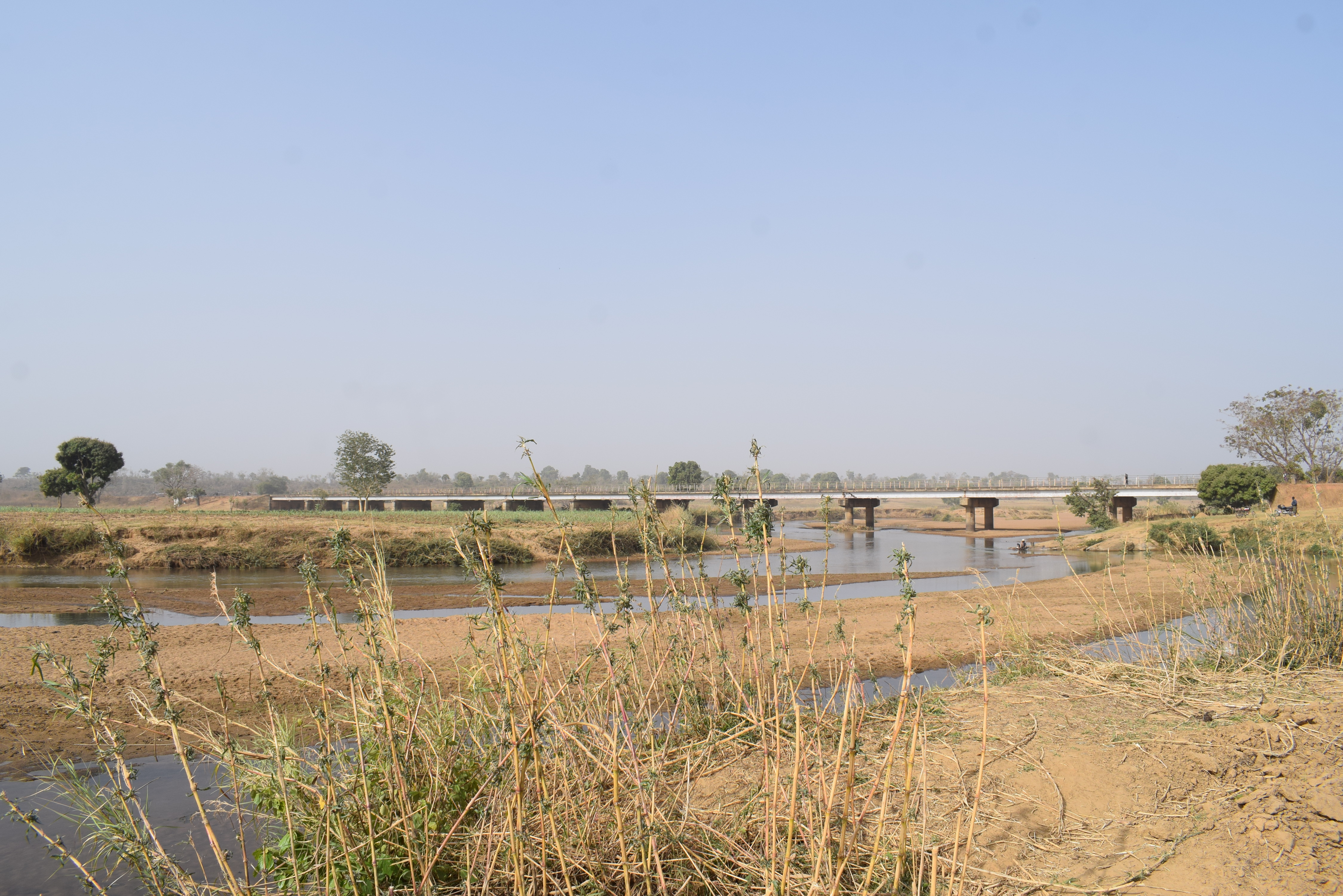
- Interactive map of Kauru
- Location within Nigeria
- Coordinates: 10°39′N 8°9′E
- Country: Nigeria
- State: Kaduna State
- Headquarters: Kauru Town

Area
  - Total: 3,186 km^{2} (1,230 sq mi)

Population (2006)Change: +3.05%/year [2016]
  - Total: 221,276
  - Density: 93.75/km^{2} (242.8/sq mi)
- 2006 National Population Census
- Time zone: UTC+1 (WAT)
- Postal code: 811
- ISO 3166 code: NG.KD.KR

Kauru is a town and Local Government Area in Kaduna State, Nigeria. The area is 3,186 km^{2}. The postal code of the area is 811.

== Boundaries ==
Kauru Local Government Area (LGA) shares boundaries with Zangon Kataf LGA to the southwest, Kajuru, Igabi and Soba LGAs to the northwest, Kubau LGA to the north, Lere LGA to the northeast, Kaura LGA to the south; and Bassa and Riyom LGAs of Plateau State to southeast, respectively.

== Administrative subdivisions ==
Kauru Local Government Area consists of 11 subdivisions (second-order administrative divisions), namely:

1. Badurum
2. Bital
3. Damakasuwa
4. Dawaki
5. Geshere
6. Kamaru
7. Kauru East
8. Kauru West
9. Kwassam
10. Makami
11. Pari

== Population ==
Kauru Local Government Area has an area of 2,810 km^{2}, with a population density of 106.3/km^{2} [2016] and annual population change of +3.05%/year. Its population was recorded to be 221,276, based on the March 21, 2006 census records. In terms of gender count, 111,119 was recorded for males and 110,157 for females. Its population was projected by the National Population Commission of Nigeria and National Bureau of Statistics to be 298,700 by March 21, 2016.

== Geography ==
Kaura Local Government Area is 485 square kilometres in size and experiences 32 degree Celsius or 89.6 degrees Fahrenheit temperatures on average. There are two distinct seasons in the area: the dry season and the rainy season. It is estimated that the annual rainfall in Kaura is approximately 1,000 mm (39 in), and the average wind speed is 11 km/h or 6.8 mph.

=== Climate ===
The year's weather is rarely overcast, with the wet season being oppressive and cloudy, while the dry season is partly cloudy and hot.

Climate change is causing a warmer temperature trend in Kauru, with the warming stripes representing annual average temperatures. With an average daily high temperature of 34 °C (94 °F), the hot season spans 2.2 months, from February 19 to April 25. At an average high temperature of 36 °C (96 °F) and low temperature of 22 °C (71 °F), April is the hottest month in Kauru. With an average daily maximum temperature below 29 °C (84 °F), the chilly season spans 3.2 months, from June 30 to October 4. December is the coldest month of the year in Kauru, with typical highs and lows of 31 °C (87 °F) and 14 °C (57 °F).

== People ==
Kauru Local Government Area consists of a number of ethnic groups and subgroups such as: Abin, Abishi, Akurmi, Amala, Anu, Atsam, Avori, Irigwe, Anunu, Koonu, Ngmgbang, Atumi[Adungi Dingi dutse]. Others are: Atyap, Hausa, Igbo.
