= Akurmi people =

Akurmi
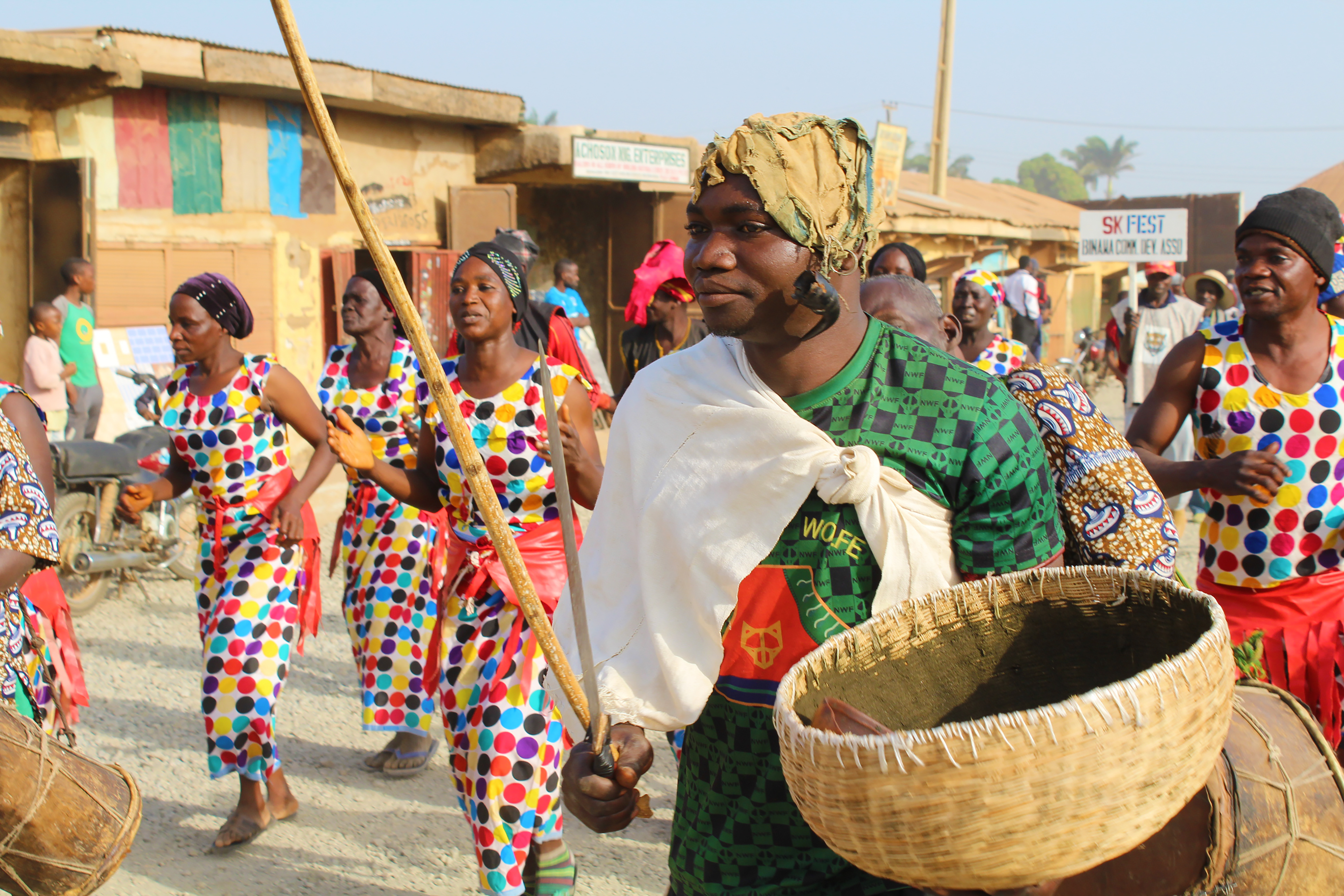
- Akurmi people in SK Fest 2024

Total population
- 77,000

Regions with significant populations
- Nigeria

Languages
- T'kurmi

Religion
- Christianity, Traditional/Cultural Beliefs, Islam

Related ethnic groups
- Abisi, Avori, Atsam, Atyap, Afizere, Berom, Jukun, and other Benue-Congo peoples of Middle Belt and southern Nigeria

The Akurmi people (Hausa: Kurama), are an ethnic group in Kaduna and Kano States which speaks the T'kurmi language, an East Kainji language of Nigeria.

== History ==
The Akurmi people, practiced subsistence farming and were said to have settled in Kaduna State around 600 years ago.

== Religion ==
The Akurmi are reportedly predominantly Christian, numbering 88.0% (with Independents at 30.0%, Protestants 50.0% and Roman Catholics 20.0%). The remaining being adherents of Ethnic religion, 6.0% and Islam, 6.0%.

== Kingship ==
The Akurmi are found in Akurmi (Kurama) Chiefdom in Lere Local Government Area. Their paramount ruler is called B'gwam Kurmi or "B'gwam Akurmi". The current monarch, HRH Dr. Ishaku S. Damina, B'gwam Kurmi II was reportedly detained by the Kaduna State governor in 2017. They are also found in Saminaka Chiefdom in the same area.
