= Afizere =

Nigerian ethnic group

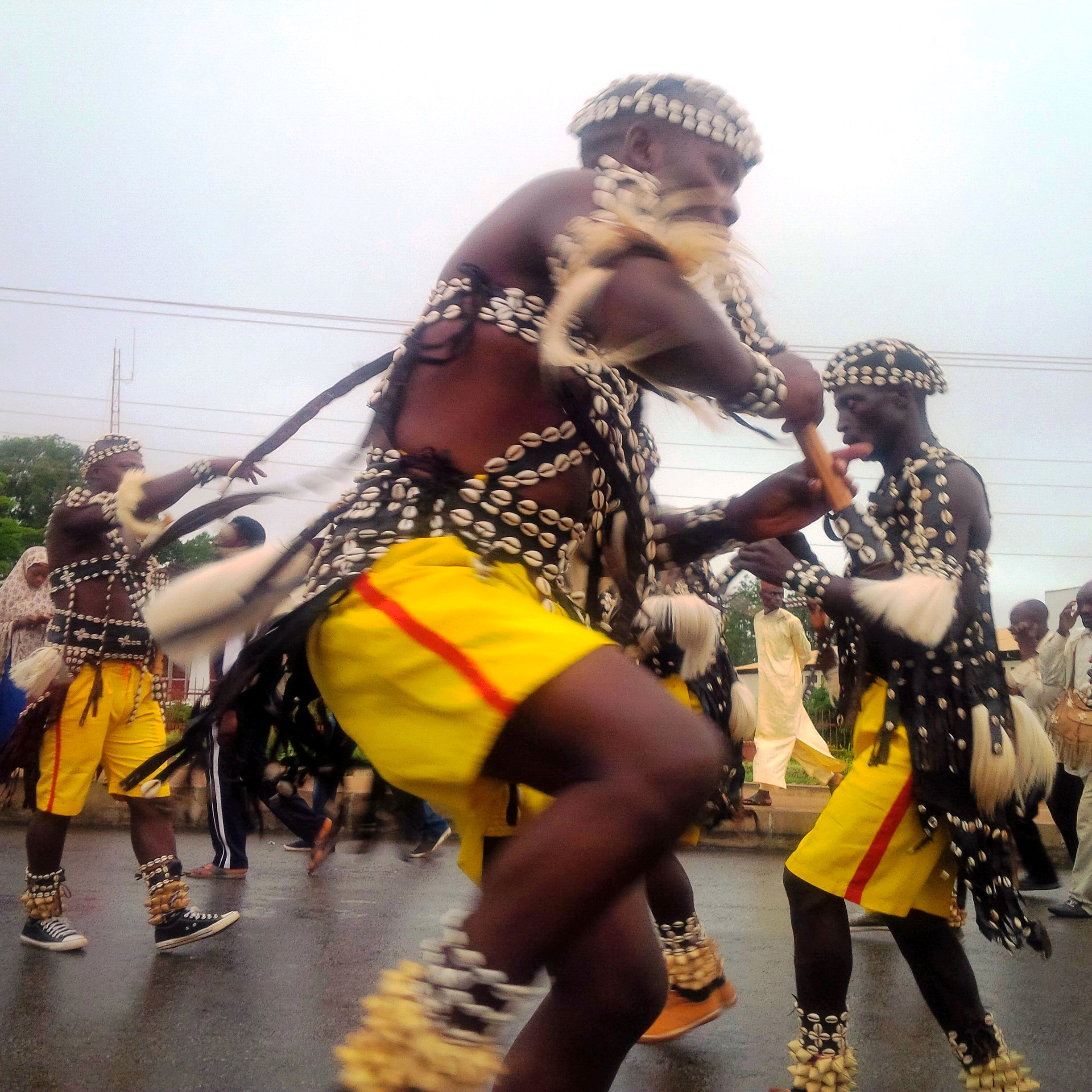
- Afizere Asharwa International dancers at Jos Carnival 2018

Total population
- Over 500,000 (2012)

Regions with significant populations
- Nigeria

Languages
- Izere, Nigerian English

Religion
- African religions, Christianity, Islam

Related ethnic groups
- Anaguta, Atyap, Bajju, Berom, Jukun, and other Platoid peoples of the Middle Belt of Nigeria, Yoruba, Igbo

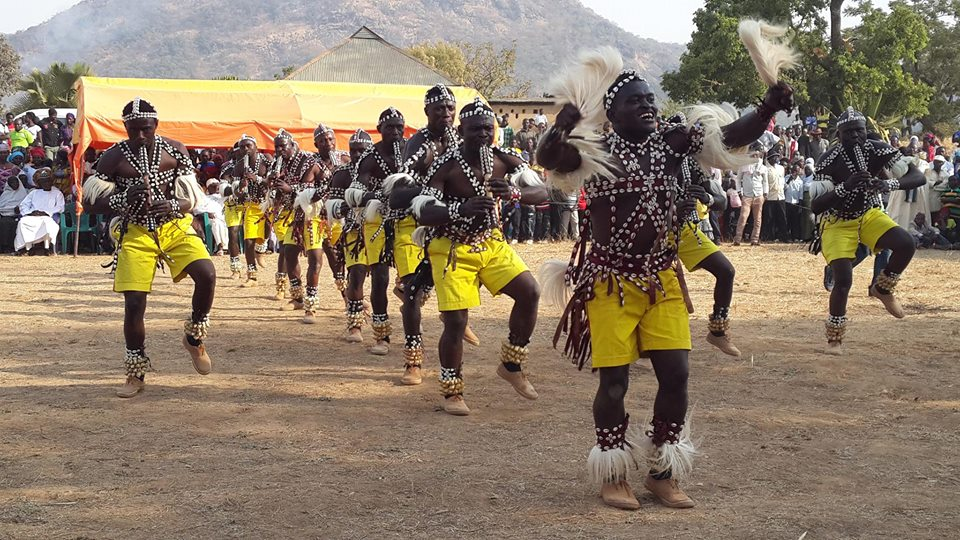
Afizere people of Plteu, Nigeria

The Afizere people (Other: Afizarek, exonym: Jarawa) are an ethnic group in Nigeria that occupy Jos East, Jos North, parts of Jos South and Mangu Local Government Areas of Plateau State and parts of Toro and Tafawa Balewa Local Government Areas of Bauchi State, Nigeria. The Afizere are speakers of Izere language. The neighbors of the Afizere to the north are the Hausa and Jarawan Dass. To the east and southeast are the Zari, Zaar and Pyem. To the south and southwest are the Berom while the Irigwe and Bache (or Rukuba) lie to the west. Northwest of the Afizere are many ethnic groups, the closest of which are the Anaguta, Bujel, Ribina, Kayauri and Duguza; more distant ones include Buji, Gusu, Sanga, Jere, Amoa, and Lemoro.

== Settlement ==
The Afizere previously settled in the Chawai region of southern Kaduna State. Over time, some Afizere groups moved southwards. The first group from Southern Kaduna settled at the foot of the hills called Gwash close to the current location of the Jos Museum and others settled at the foot of Shere Hills in the Jos Plateau. Afizere clans settled southwards of Chawai lands. More than 500,000 Afizere people, distributed over 16 major traditional districts, inhabit territories within Jos North, Jos East, Mangu, in Plateau State and Tafawa-Balewa and Toro Local Government Areas in Bauchi State. During the pre-colonial period, the people lived in hilly terrains surrounding the Jos Plateau as a defense mechanism against jihadist attacks during and after the Fulani Jihad. Afizere towns and villages include Dong, Tudun Wada (Gyese), Kabong, Jos Jarawa, Rikkos, Fudawa, Kwanga, Fobur, Angware, Maijuju, Fusa, and Gwafan (Lamingo), Shere, Zandi, etc.

== Culture ==
Izere towns have a traditional and gerontocratic chieftaincy system that is headed by an Agwom and supported by five districts heads representing the five royal families of the Afizere: Fobur, Forsum, Maigemu, Shere, and Federe. In Afizere land, a district could be a combination of 6 to 12 villages. Historically, the Agwom was also the chief priest of the people.

Asharuwa, a traditional dance, is part of the cultural heritage the Afizere have maintained over the years. Asharuwa dance groups have performed in many countries, including the US, UK, Canada, Germany, South Africa, Ukraine, and Kenya.

== Language ==
The language of the people, Izere, is considered part of the Benue-Congo language group that is prominent in Central Nigeria. Izere is spoken in five different dialects. The dialects are:

- Ibor, spoken largely in the Fobur district
- Isum, spoken in Forsum villages
- Iganang, spoken in Shere
- Ifudere, spoken in Federe
- Ikyo

== Dresses ==
Kings wear kukpra and have their hair barbed in a row with horizontal cut on their heads to represent a crown. They have a ceremonial staff called an akbong with one strand. Priests wear the same clothes as the king, but what differentiates them is the king's haircut and his staff, as the priest's akbong has two strands. Men wear itak round their waists. Women wear akpi made from atufa or agindo, covering their chest and going around their waists. Kurus are used to keep babies tight on the back of their mothers and it is water resistant. For brides and grooms, the same clothing they would normally wear is used, but it is freshly made.

Izere colors and their order

1. Green [naya] signifies agriculture
2. White [cha’an] signifies peace
3. Yellow [izizere] signifies the language
4. Black [aga’ab] signifies strength
5. Cowries [icribi] signifies wealth

== Religion ==
Christianity and Islam are the two major religions among the Afizere, but some Afizere still choose to adhere to their traditional beliefs. In traditional Afizere religion, there is a supreme deity Adakunom (father of the sun" or ""father, the sun" or "mighty sun") who is considered the creator and source of life and health. A few minor gods exist to act as mediators to Adakunom. Then there are the spirits or witches who are the source of both good and evil.

The traditional religion dominate the ethnicity of the Afizere people, and they refer to Adakunom as the supreme creator which translate to "Father of the sun". They also recognizes other spiritual mediators as well as the ancestral spiritual forces in the land. Christianity was introduced and spread through the missionary work while Islam was introduced through political influence.

The Izere people like many other tribes or ethnic groups have unique names given to children at birth. A child could be named in accordance to a situation or circumstance leading to his/her birth.

== Dances ==
Many forms of dance are part of this people's culture.

- Asharwa — predominantly performed by young Afizere boys and men; all occasions
- Amata — predominantly performed by Afizere women both young and old; all occasions
- Agba — predominantly performed by men both young and old during royal outing, coronations or royal ceremonies
- Agafu — predominantly performed by Afizere men; all occasions
- Asurbe — performed by all categories of Afizere during funeral rite of an elderly person only
- Natoo abarshi/ikap/isun — performed mostly during farming/harvest primarily by Afizere men
- Apanga — performed by only royalty; during ceremonies/coronation
- Natoo rekuron — predominantly performed by young and elderly women; only during farming activities

Additionally, beating of drums and singing on the farm is customary, with the asum - mata leading.

== Food ==
The Afizere people have different foods and mode of preparation that distinguishes them from other ethnic groups. A few are:

- Ikam Itson (hungry rice), made from muster and water
- Akare (Gwate, Pate), made from grinded maize, vegetables, garden eggs, sorel (yakuwa) and water
- Iririr, made from grinded abusu, meat, little water, salt, pepper and nami rifar (olive oil)
- Nakan, made from hungry rice (muster seed) honey and water
- Akpam, made from hungry rice (muster), red oil and water
- Asirik itcha, made from millet and tamber
- Asirik Itson, made from ground muster (hungry rice) and water
- Asirik Ariron, made from ariron and guinea corn
- Rining Kapkok (soup), made from Izōs, rituh, natok, kapkok, salt and water
- Ishutuk (round about beans), made from Ishutuk, abusu, salt, and pepper namai rifar
