= Rahama =

Town in Plateau State, Nigeria

- Town
- Rahama
- Location within Nigeria
- Coordinates: 09°48′00″N 08°32′00″E
- Country: Nigeria
- State: Plateau State
- LGA: Bassa
- Time zone: UTC+01:00 (WAT)
- Climate: Aw

Rahama is a small town in the highlands of Pari, Kauru Local Government Area of southern Kaduna State, central Nigeria.

== Transport ==
It was served for a time by the extra narrow gauge Bauchi Light Railway which connected Zaria in the north to Jos in the south.

In later times, this route was replaced by a better graded normal gauge railway on a different alignment.

By 1913, two railway wires passed from Rahama to Jengre.

== Economy Activity ==
The economy Activity in this place is farming which is agricultural production due rivers in the area.

== Communication ==
=== Telegraph ===
Telegraph services came to the area from the then-Northern Nigeria Protectorate capital, Zungeru, through Naraguta in 1913. The Telegraph was later connected to Jengre in the same year.

== See also ==
- Railway stations in Nigeria
