= Jengre =

Town in Pengana, Bassa, Plateau State, Nigeria

- Town and Chiefdom Headquarters
- Jengre
- Location within Nigeria
- Coordinates: 10°14′00″N 08°48′00″E
- Country: Nigeria
- State: Plateau State
- LGA: Bassa
- Time zone: UTC+01:00 (WAT)
- Climate: Aw

Jengre is a town in Pengana Chiefdom, Jere District, Bassa LGA, Plateau State, Nigeria. It is one of the Jere settlements. It is located in the northern region of Bassa LGA, bordering Kaduna State from the north at Kan'iyaka. Jengre is the headquarter of Pengana Chiefdom and home to the paramount ruler of the chiefdom, Ogomo Pengana. The Ogomo palace was built in Jere town of Jengre around 1952 and has since become the permanent residence of the chiefdom's ruler.

== Communication ==
=== Telegraph ===
The Telegraph line from the then-Northern Nigeria Protectorate capital, Zungeru, which passed through Naraguta and Rahama, reached Jengre by 1913. A local office was also constructed there, too, as well as two railway wires between Rahama and Jengre.
