= LDJ =

LDJ or ldj may stand for:

- Lemoro language, spoken in Nigeria (ISO 639:ldj)
- Ligue de Défense Juive, the Jewish Defense League in France
- Linden Airport, United States (IATA:LDJ)
