= SQH =

SQH or sqh may refer to:

- SQH, the IATA code for Nà Sản Airport, Sơn La Province, Vietnam
- SQH, the National Rail station code for Sanquhar railway station, Dumfries and Galloway, Scotland
- sqh, the ISO 639-3 code for Shau language, Nigeria
