= Gusu =

Gusu may refer to:

- Gusu District in China
- Gusu language of Nigeria
- Gusu woodland in southern Africa
