= BYJ (disambiguation) =

BYJ may refer to:

- Beja Airport, Portugal (by IATA code)
- Bina language, spoken in Nigeria (by ISO 639 code)
- Bae Yong-joon, Korean actor
