= Kono language =

Kono language may refer to the following languages of West Africa:

- Kono language (Sierra Leone) (kno), spoken by the Kono people
- Kono language (Guinea) (knu), a variety of the Kpelle language
- Kono language (Nigeria) (klk), a Kainji language
