= Sanga language =

Sanga language may refer to:

- Sanga language (Nigeria), a language of Nigeria
- Sanga language (Bantu), a language of the Democratic Republic of Congo
