= Gamo-Ningi language =

Extinct Kainji dialect cluster of Nigeria

Gamo-Ningi
- tì-Gamo
- Native to: Nigeria
- Region: Ningi, Bauchi State
- Ethnicity: 15,000 (1992)
- Extinct: 1980s
- Language family: Niger–Congo?: Atlantic–Congo; Benue–Congo; Kainji; East Kainji; Gamo-Ningi

Language codes
- ISO 639-3: bte
- Glottolog: gamo1241

Gamo
- Person: dòò-Gamo
- People: à-ndi-Gamo
- Language: tì-Gamo

Gamo and Ningi are a Kainji dialect cluster of Nigeria. Most of the 15,000 Gamo-Ningi spoke Hausa. The Gamo dialect is also known as à-ndi-Gamo, Ba-Buche, Ba-Mbutu, Buta, Butancii, Butawa, Butu, Mbotu, Mbuta, or tì-Gamo.

The dialect cluster was spoken in Ningi, Bauchi State. It has no known L1 speakers, the last known speaker having died in the 1980s; speakers have since shifted to Hausa.
