= Sheni-Ziriya language =

Kainji language spoken in Nigeria

Ziriya
- Sheni
- Native to: Nigeria
- Region: Bauchi State (Ziriya), Kaduna State (Sheni)
- Ethnicity: 3,500 (2004?)
- Native speakers: 6 Sheni, no known Ziriya (2004)
- Language family: Niger–Congo?: Atlantic–Congo; Benue–Congo; Kainji; East Kainji; Ziriya

Language codes
- ISO 639-3: scv
- Glottolog: shen1251
- ELP: Ziriya
- Sheni

Seni
- Person: onoSeni
- People: anaSeni
- Language: tiSeni

Ziriya (Jiriya) and Sheni (Shaini) constitute a Kainji language of Nigeria. They are geographically but perhaps not linguistically distinct.

== Attestation ==
The earliest reference to the Sheni language is in Temple (1922), who links the Sheni with the Srubu and mentions their presence in Dan Galadima District of the Zaria Emirate. As of 2004, there are six remaining fluent speakers of Sheni and perhaps 10–15 semi-fluent speakers. Sheni informants state that their language is the same as Ziriya.

The Ziriya language is first mentioned by Shimizu (1982), who gives a brief wordlist. The word given by Shimizu's informants differ from one another, perhaps due to faulty recall. Shimizu's informant Sarkin Abubakar Yakubu is probably the remaining speaker of the Ziriya language. He had only spoken it as a child, some sixty years prior. He could recall several greetings and some numbers, all of which corresponded to Sheni, supporting the assertion that Sheni and Ziriya were the same language.

== Language status ==
The Sheni people have shifted to Hausa. They now call themselves the Shenawa and refer to their language as Shenanci. The loss of their language is taken as a fait accompli and there is no interest in reviving it. Its continued existence is merely a curiosity to most of the Sheno, according to Blench.

Blench (2012) reports that there are only six speakers of Sheni.

== Morphology ==
Sheni has a distinctive plural morphology that suggests influence from an unknown but typologically quite different language. The first element of the stem is reduplicated according to a variety of patterns. Some examples:

Gloss	sg.	pl.
seed	ùgbέrù	ùgbέgbέrù
forest	ùshìrím	ùshìríshím
neck	iyâw	iyâwyâw
ear	ùtùway	tutuwáy
