= Gyem language =

Kainji language of Bauchi State, Nigeria

Gyem
- Native to: Nigeria
- Region: Bauchi State
- Native speakers: 2,000 (2019)
- Language family: Niger–Congo?: Atlantic–Congo; Benue–Congo; Kainji; East Kainji; Gyem

Language codes
- ISO 639-3: gye
- Glottolog: gyem1238
- ELP: Gyem
- Abom is classified as Critically Endangered by the UNESCO Atlas of the World's Languages in Danger

Gyem is a Kainji language of Bauchi State, Nigeria.

== Sources ==
- Blench, Roger. Gyem: an endangered east Kainji language of Northern Nigeria.
