= Lere language =

Endangered Kainji dialect cluster of Nigeria

Lere
- Native to: Nigeria
- Region: Plateau State, Bauchi State
- Ethnicity: 16,000 (2000)
- Extinct: 2018
- Language family: Niger–Congo?: Atlantic–Congo; Benue–Congo; Kainji; East Kainji; Lere
- Dialects: Si; Gana; Takaya (Taura)

Language codes
- ISO 639-3: gnh
- Glottolog: lere1241
- ELP: Lere

Lere is an extinct Kainji dialect cluster of Nigeria. The ethnic population was cited as 16,000 in 2000, of whom only a few speak the language. A wordlist from the Takaya dialect can be found under External links.

== Dialects ==
Dialects are:

- Si (Rishuwa, Kuzamani)
- Gana
- Takaya (Taura)
