= Iguta language =

Kainji language spoken in Nigeria

Guta
- Naraguta
- Iguta
- Native to: Nigeria
- Region: Plateau State
- Ethnicity: Anaguta
- Native speakers: 10,000 (2021)
- Language family: Niger–Congo?: Atlantic–Congo; Benue–Congo; Kainji; East Kainji; Guta

Language codes
- ISO 639-3: nar
- Glottolog: igut1238

Guta
- Person: Unaguta
- People: Anaguta
- Language: Iguta

The Guta language, or Iguta, also recorded as Naraguta, is a Plateau language of Nigeria. It is spoken by the Guta people numbering between 10,000 to 12,000 individuals.
