= Kudu-Camo language =

Nearly extinct Kainji dialect cluster of Nigeria

Kudu-Camo
- Native to: Nigeria
- Region: Bauchi State
- Native speakers: (42 cited 1990)
- Language family: Niger–Congo?: Atlantic–Congo; Benue–Congo; Kainji; East Kainji; Kudu-Camo

Language codes
- ISO 639-3: kov
- Glottolog: kudu1241
- ELP: Kudu-Camo

Kudu and Camo (Chamo) are a nearly extinct Kainji dialect cluster of Nigeria.
