= Dungu language =

Kainji language of Nigeria

Dungu
- Dingi, Dwingi
- Native to: Nigeria
- Region: Kaduna State
- Native speakers: (1,100 cited 2000)
- Language family: Niger–Congo?: Atlantic–Congo; Benue–Congo; Kainji; East Kainji; Dungu

Language codes
- ISO 639-3: dbv
- Glottolog: dung1254
- ELP: Dungu

Dungu (also Dingi) is a Kainji language of Nigeria.
