= Atsam language =

Kainji language spoken in Nigeria

Atsam
- Cawai
- Native to: Nigeria
- Region: Kaduna State and Plateau State
- Ethnicity: Atsam
- Native speakers: (30,000 cited 1982)
- Language family: Niger–Congo?: Atlantic–Congo; Benue–Congo; Kainji; East Kainji; Piti–Atsam; Atsam

Language codes
- ISO 639-3: cch
- Glottolog: atsa1241

Tsam
- Person: Tsam
- People: Atsam
- Country: Yinatsam

Atsam (Tyap: Tsamyia̱, Hausa: Chawai, Cawai, Chawe), is a Kainji language of Nigeria. It is spoken by the Atsam people, mainly found in Kauru LGA of Kaduna State and Bassa LGA of Plateau State, Middle Belt, Nigeria.
