= Shau language =

Extinct Kainji language of Nigeria

Shau
- Lìsháù
- Native to: Nigeria
- Region: Bauchi State
- Extinct: (date missing)
- Language family: Niger–Congo?: Atlantic–Congo; Benue–Congo; Kainji; East Kainji; Shau

Language codes
- ISO 639-3: sqh
- Glottolog: shau1238
- ELP: Shau

Shau (Sho), or Lìsháù, is an extinct Kainji language of Nigeria.
