= Map language =

Kainji language spoken in Nigeria

Map
- Amo
- Timap
- Native to: Nigeria
- Region: Plateau, Kaduna and Kano states
- Native speakers: (12,000 cited 2000)
- Language family: Niger–Congo?: Atlantic–Congo; Benue–Congo; Kainji; East Kainji; Map

Language codes
- ISO 639-3: amo
- Glottolog: amoo1242

Map
- Person: Kumap
- People: Amap
- Language: Timap

Map (Timap), or Amo (Among), is a divergent Kainji language of Nigeria.

== Phonology ==
=== Consonants ===
The consonant sounds are located in the chart below.

		Bilabial	Labiodental	Dental	Alveolar	Post- alveolar	Palatal	Velar	Glottal
Nasal		m							
Plosive								k	
Affricate									
Fricative									
Approximant	Median								
Approximant	Lateral								

=== Vowels ===
	Front	Central	Back
Close	i		
Mid			
Open			
