= Josiah Timothy Tinat =

Nigerian field hockey player

Personal information
- Full name: Josiah Timothy Tinat Abui
- Nationality: Nigerian-Italian
- Born: 1985 (age 40–41) Kaduna State, Nigeria

Sport
- Sport: Field hockey

Josiah Timothy Tinat Abui (born 1985) is a Nigerian-Italian field hockey player who represented his country at the 2003 All-Africa Games in Abuja, Nigeria, as a defender, with the Nigerian team coming 4th after losing to Ghana 2:1 in the 3rd place match. He again featured in the first Afro-Asian Games hosted in Hyderabad, India, still in October 2003.

== Career ==
In 2007, Tinat moved to Sardinia, Italy, to play for Cus Cagliari. While there, he became a strong support for the game in Sardinia.

== Literary work ==
Tinat in 2016 authored a literary work on migration:

- Perché migriamo (Why We Migrate)

== Personal life ==
When Tinat arrived Cagliari, he met and married a Sardinian lady.
