= Piti language =

Kainji language spoken in Nigeria

Piti
- Bishi or Abisi
- Native to: Kaduna Nigeria
- Region: Lere and Kauru, Kaduna State
- Native speakers: 8,100 (2013)
- Language family: Niger–Congo?: Atlantic–Congo; Benue–Congo; Kainji; East Kainji; Piti–Atsam; Piti

Language codes
- ISO 639-3: pcn
- Glottolog: piti1243
- ELP: Piti

Bishi
- People: Abishi
- Language: Ibishi

Piti (Pitti, Bishi, Bisi) is a minor Kainji language of Kaduna State, Nigeria. Bishi speakers live in at least 26 villages.

Ngmgbang (Riban, Rigmgbang) was formerly listed as a dialect of Bishi, but is clearly a distinct although related language. It is spoken in a few villages in Kaduna State.

The Piti people are spread out in Nigeria and beyond. Where their presence is known they constitute a body known as The Piti association eg. Piti Association of Jos.
