= Lemoro language =

Kainji language of Nigeria

Lemoro
- Emoro
- Native to: Nigeria
- Region: Plateau and Bauchi states
- Native speakers: (10,000 cited 1998)
- Language family: Niger–Congo?: Atlantic–Congo; Benue–Congo; Kainji; East Kainji; Lemoro

Language codes
- ISO 639-3: ldj
- Glottolog: lemo1242

Moro
- Person: Ōdánāmōrō / Limoro
- People: Ànámōrō
- Language: Èmóró

Lemoro is a Kainji language of Nigeria.

== Villages ==
List of villages:

Bassa LGA, Plateau State (village names are in LeMoro):

- Rémà (Hausa name: Rīmī)
- Bùgú (named after a communal hunting forest)
- Òcèmà (Hausa name: Gìmí)
- Kàbàkè (named after a nearby cave)
- Kàtìrbì
- Rádé
- Bìjàró (named after the Euphorbia cactus)
- Góndòŋ
- The
- Village
- Kàzóŋgó (Hausa name: Bàkín Kògī; headquarters of Limoro District)

Toro LGA, Bauchi State (village names are in Hausa unless noted otherwise):

- Dáŋkā
- Pìŋgjél (from another language, not Hausa)
- Dáŋgárà
- Sàùké
- Dógón Sàŋgà
- Wànú (from another language, not Hausa)
- Dókà Límóró

Kauru LGA, Kaduna State:

- Kùzùntú (from another language, not Hausa)

Lere LGA, Kaduna State (village names are in Hausa unless noted otherwise):

- Gídán Wáyà (literally means ‘telephone wire’ in Hausa)
- Marmara
- Lezuru (from another language, not Hausa)
- Sabon Cini

Doguwa LGA, Kano State (village names are in Hausa):

- Lemu
- Nasarawa
- Banki

== Numerals ==
LeMoro cardinal numerals from one to ten are:

1. one – díyí
2. two – lérē
3. three – tááró
4. four – názé
5. five – sììbì
6. six – tààsè
7. seven – súndāré
8. eight – ùrírú
9. nine – tùrày
10. ten – bìtúɽú
