= Vono language =

Nearly extinct Kainji language of Nigeria

Vono
- Native to: Nigeria
- Region: Kaduna State
- Native speakers: (500 cited 1973)
- Language family: Niger–Congo?: Atlantic–Congo; Benue–Congo; Kainji; East Kainji; Vono

Language codes
- ISO 639-3: kch
- Glottolog: vono1238

Vɔnɔ
- People: Avɔnɔ
- Language: Kivɔnɔ

Vono, also known as Kiwollo (Kiballo), is a nearly extinct Kainji language of Nigeria.
