= Zora language =

Kainji language of Nigeria

Zora
- Izora
- Native to: Nigeria
- Region: Plateau State
- Native speakers: 19 (2016)
- Language family: Niger–Congo?: Atlantic–Congo; Benue–Congo; Kainji; East Kainji; Zora

Language codes
- ISO 639-3: cbo
- Glottolog: izor1238
- ELP: Izora

Zora
- Person: uZora
- People: aZora
- Language: iZora

Zora (Izora), or Cokoba (Cokobanci) in Hausa, is a Kainji language of Nigeria.

== Demographics ==
According to Blench (2016), Zora, also called Chokobo, is spoken by 19 speakers in some two hours drive from Jos. The speakers are all over 60 years and rarely talk to one another since they are spread across 10 settlements. The morphology and phonology have been highly eroded as well.

== Sources ==
- Blench, Roger. Zora: a highly endangered East Kainji language of Northern Nigeria.
