= Shuwa-Zamani language =

Kainji language spoken in Nigeria

Shuwa-Zamani
- Native to: Nigeria
- Region: Bauchi State
- Native speakers: (1,000 cited 1973)
- Language family: Niger–Congo?: Atlantic–Congo; Benue–Congo; Kainji; East Kainji; Shuwa-Zamani

Language codes
- ISO 639-3: Either: izm – Kizamani rsw – Rishiwa
- Glottolog: shuw1238

Shuwa-Zamani (Kuzamani, Rishuwa) is a Kainji language of Nigeria.
