= Lois Ihwo =

Nigerian businesswoman and entrepreneur

Lois Andrew Ihwo
- Born: Lois Ihwo; Bassa, Plateau State
- Occupations: Businesswoman, Entrepreneur
- Known for: Founder of Dee Utensils and Dee Scent Global
- Children: 2

Lois Andrew Ihwo is a Nigerian businesswoman and entrepreneur. She is the founder of Dee Utensils and Dee Scent Global. In 2026, she was awarded the African Iconic Woman in Business of the Year at the 15th African Iconic Women Recognition Awards (AIWRA).

== Life and career ==
Ihwo was born in Bassa, Plateau State. She has a degree in business administration and a diploma in computer science and French. Ihwo started her career working with the ministry of environment under forestry research institute of Nigeria and worked for 11 years, before resigning to start her own business.

She launched Dee Utensils as a luxury kitchenware company, before expanding into the production and sales of premium fragrances and candles as Dee Scent Global.

== Dee Utensils ==
The company started as a one sales outlet in Abuja, before expanding to four states in Nigeria. Ihwo told The Guardian Nigeria, that she started the company "to provide high-quality kitchen utensils of global standards and to transform kitchens into modern, unique and simple environments for any cook".

== Awards and recognition ==
In 2025, Ihwo received an honorary doctorate degree from American Management University, California and also received an Award of Excellence in Affordable Luxury Kitchen Solution at the Africa-UK Trade & Investment Conference & Awards 2025 in London for "her contribution to providing durable, stylish and affordable kitchenware for global consumers".

On 7 December 2025, she was conferred with the traditional title of Tauraruwan Matan Kasar Jiwa (Shining Star Woman of Jiwa Land) by the Emir of Jiwa, Idris Musa, in recognition of her contributions to business, philanthropy and community development.

In 2026, Ihwo received an honorary doctorate degree in International Business and Management and Corporate Governance by the International Entrepreneurship University, Delaware for her "outstanding contributions to entrepreneurship, corporate leadership, business development, and her unwavering commitment to empowering individuals and communities through enterprise".

In 2026, she was awarded the African Iconic Woman in Business of the Year at the 15th African Iconic Women Recognition Awards (AIWRA) in recognition of her "contributions to business development, women empowerment, philanthropy, and mentorship" and became a fellow of the Institute of Entrepreneurship and Executive Development (IEED), Ghana.

== Philanthropy ==
Ihwo, through her Dee Ihwo Foundation has engaged in women’s empowerment programmes, support for widows, educational scholarships for underprivileged children and health-related community projects in Plateau State and the North-Central region of Nigeria.

== Personal life ==
Ihwo is married with two children.
