= Kaivi language =

Kainji language of Nigeria

Kaivi
- Native to: Nigeria
- Region: Kaduna State
- Native speakers: (2,300 cited 2000)
- Language family: Niger–Congo?: Atlantic–Congo; Benue–Congo; Kainji; East Kainji; Kaivi

Language codes
- ISO 639-3: kce
- Glottolog: kaiv1238
- ELP: Kaivi

Kaivi (also Anunu) is a Kainji language of Nigeria.
