= East Kainji languages =

Kainji language group of Nigeria

East Kainji
- Geographic distribution: Kaduna, Plateau, and Bauchi states, Nigeria
- Linguistic classification: Niger–Congo?: Atlantic–Congo; Benue–Congo; Kainji; East Kainji

Language codes
- Glottolog: east2404

The East Kainji languages are spoken in a compact area of the Jos Plateau in Nigeria, near Jos. There are more than 20 of them, most of which are poorly studied.

== History ==
East Kainji languages are less internally diverse than some of the other Plateau branches in the Nigerian Middle Belt (Blench 2007). Historically, the East Kainji branch had been influenced by Chadic languages that no longer exist in the region. Today, there are at most 100,000 speakers of East Kainji languages, with almost all languages of the languages being threatened by larger languages such as Hausa and English. Although they are morphologically simple, they have 4-level tones instead of the 3-level tones typical of the region.

At the time of the British conquest, several of these languages were in the process of shifting from duodecimal to decimal systems. Languages attested with such systems include Janji, Gure-Kahugu (Gbiri-Niragu) and Piti.

== Features ==
Compared to the neighbouring Plateau languages, East Kainji languages are morphologically simple. They have four level tones, as opposed to most other languages in the Nigerian Middle Belt having only three level tones. The fourth tone in East Kainji languages originated as a superhigh tone used to mark plurals.

Syllables in East Kainji languages are generally open (CV). Blench (2020) suggests that the East Kainji branch is most closely related to Basa, since both have (C)V-CVCV phonotactic structures.

== Classification ==
East Kainji was once thought to be a primary branch of the Kainji languages, but this is no longer the case. Impressionistically, Piti and Atsam appear to be distinct, but the rest form a continuous dialect chain.

The East Kainji languages have historically undergone influence from non-Hausa West Chadic languages. East Kainji is not as internally diverse as West Kainji.

=== Ethnologue ===
Ethnologue indicates several branches; these will be retained here for reference:

- Piti–Atsam
- Jos languages: Amo (Map)
  - Northern Jos languages:
    - Jera languages: Lere, Ziriya (Sheni?)
      - Lameic languages: Gyem, Shau
      - Ningic languages: Gamo-Ningi, Kudu-Camo
      - North-Central Jos languages: Iguta (Guta), Janji, Tunzuii (Tunzu)
        - Boze-Loro languages: Jere, Panawa
        - Chokobo-Lemoro-Sanga languages: Izora (Zora)
        - Lemoro-Sanga languages: Lemoro, Sanga
    - Kauru languages: Kurama, Gbiri-Niragu (Gure-Kahugu), Bina, Dungu, Kaivi, Kinuku, Kono, Mala, Ruma, Shuwa-Zamani, Surubu, Tumi, Vono

=== Blench (2018) ===
Most recent Kainji classification by Blench (2018:83):

- Amic languages: Map
- Tsamic languages: Tsam (Cahwai), Ngmgbang, Bishi (Piti)
- Kaduna languages: Gbiri-Niragu, Shuwa-Zamani, Vori (Shuwa-Zamani), Kurmi (Kurama), Mala-Ruma, Bin, Kono, Kaivi, Vono, Tumi, Dungu, Nu (Kinuku)
- North-central cluster: Lemoro, Janji, Iguta (Guta), Zora (Cokobo) (moribund)
  - Shammɔ cluster: Sanga, Gusu, Moro, Loro, Bunu, Tunzu (Duguza)
    - (branch): Zele (Jere), Boze, Panawa
- Northern Jos group:
  - Sheni cluster: Ziriya (extinct), Kere (extinct), Sheni (almost extinct)
  - Lere cluster: Si (extinct), Gana (extinct), Takaya (extinct)
  - Lame cluster: Gyem, Shau (extinct)
  - Ningi cluster: Kudu-Camo (almost extinct), Gamo-Ningi (Butu-Ningi) (extinct)

=== Blench (2012) ===
In Blench's 2012 classification, Piti–Atsam is named "Southern". Northern Jos is named "Jos", and the Jera languages are named "Northern Jos", which he further subdivides into several dialect clusters; Amo is placed in this group.

In the tree below given by Blench (2012), East Kainji is split into a core Jos group and peripheral Southern group.

- Southern group: Piti, Atsam
- Jos group (Jera):
  - Lere cluster: Si (almost extinct), Gana (almost extinct), Takaya (almost extinct)
  - North-central cluster:, Izora (Cokobo), Lemoro, Sanga, Janji, εBoze (Buji), iGusu, iZele (Jere), iBunu (Ribina), iPanawa-iLoro, Iguta, Tunzu (Duguza), tiMap
  - Sheni cluster: Ziriya (extinct), Kere (extinct), Sheni (almost extinct)
  - Kauru group: Gbiri-Niragu, Shuwa-Zamani, Surubu, Kurama, Mala-Ruma, Bina, Kono, Kaivi, Vono, Tumi, Kinuku, Dungu
  - Northern group (Ningi-Lame):
    - Ningi cluster: Kudu-Camo (almost extinct), Gamo-Ningi (Butu-Ningi) (†)
    - Lame cluster: Gyem (almost extinct), Shau (almost extinct)

=== Shimizu (1982) ===
Classification of the Northern Jos group according to Shimizu (1982: 165):

- Northern Jos
  - R-group
    - Rahama: Ziriya, Sheni
    - South: Janji, Jere, Guta
  - L-group
    - Central
      - Zora (Chokobo)
      - Moro, Sanga
    - North
      - Lere
        - Takaya (Taura)
        - Si (Rishuwa), Gana
      - Lame-Ningi
        - Lame: Gyem, Shau
        - Ningi
          - Kudu (Kuda), Chamo
          - Gamo (Butu), Ningi

Shimizu (1982) also reconstructs Proto-Northern Jos.

=== Glottolog ===
Glottolog's classification is similar to Blench's, but the Piti–Atsam name is retained. In this classification, all languages except for Piti–Atsam are grouped under "Jos". Amo, while within the "Jos" group, is left out of both Kauru and Jera (or "Northern Jos", following Blench).

Only Kurama, Gbiri-Niragu, Jere, Sanga and Lemoro have more than a few thousand speakers.

== Names and locations ==
Below is a comprehensive list of East Kainji language names, populations, and locations from Blench (2019).

	Language	Branch	Cluster	Dialects	Alternate spellings	Own name for language	Endonym(s)	Other names (location-based)	Other names for language	Exonym(s)	Speakers	Location(s)	Notes
Map	Amic			Amon, Among	Timap	Kumap pl. Amap		Ba		3,550 (NAT 1950)	Plateau State, Bassa LGA; Kaduna State, Saminaka LGA		
Atsam	A					sg. Tsam, pl. Atsam			Chawai, Chawe, Chawi	10,200 (1931 Gunn); 30,000 (1972 Barrett)	Kaduna State, Kachia LGA		
Bishi	A		Riban (Ngmgbang) was formerly listed as a dialect, but is clearly a distinct language	Abisi, Bisi		xx pl. Abishi		Pitti		1,600 (NAT 1950); Live in at least 26 villages (Ajaegbu et al. 2013)	Kaduna State, Saminaka LGA	no data	
Ngmgbang	A		Formerly listed as a dialect of Bishi, but is clearly a distinct language	Ribam	Rigmgbang					few villages (Ajaegbu et al. 2013)	Kaduna State, Saminaka LGA	no data	
Lere cluster (extinct)	"Northern Jos"	Lere (extinct)								765 (NAT 1949); 1,000 (1973 SIL); languages extinct	Bauchi State, Toro LGA		
Si	"Northern Jos"	Lere (extinct)				Rishuwa	Kauru	Kuzamani					
Gana (extinct)	"Northern Jos"	Lere (extinct)								Extinct			
Takaya (extinct)	"Northern Jos"	Lere (extinct)						Taura		Extinct			
Gamo–Ningi cluster	Gamo-Ningi	Gamo–Ningi								15,000 but most speak Hausa.	Bauchi State, Ningi LGA		
Gamo	Gamo-Ningi	Gamo–Ningi			tì-Gamo	dòò-Gamo pl. à-ndi-Gamo		Butancii	Buta, Butawa, Butu	There are some 32 settlements of Gamo, but of these only Kurmi still spoke the language in 1974 (Shimizu 1982).			
Ningi	Gamo-Ningi	Gamo–Ningi											
Iguta	C					Anaguta	Naraguta			2,580 (HDG); 3,000 (1973 SIL)	Plateau State, Bassa LGA		
Janji	C			Jenji	Tìjánjí	Ajanji			Anafejanzi	360 (NAT 1950)	Plateau State, Bassa LGA		
Jere cluster	C	Jere		Jera, Jeere						23,000 (1972 SIL)	Plateau State, Bassa LGA; Bauchi State, Toro LGA		
Boze	C	Jere	Boze is divided into 3 dialects, εGorong, εKɔkɔŋ as well as a third rather divergent speech form, εFiru	Anabeze	eBoze	unaBoze pl. anaBoze	Buji			εGorong (2500?), εKɔkɔŋ (3000) εFiru (1500?) (Blench est, 2003). Due to language loss, especially in road settlements, there are considerably more ethnic Boze. Ethnologue figures are total district populations, not speakers.	Plateau State, Bassa LGA. Both sides of the Jos-Zaria road, directly north of Jos.		
Gusu	C	Jere		Gussum	i–Sanga	sg. o–Sanga, pl. a–Sanga		Anibau, Anosangobari		2,350 (1936 HDG)	Plateau State, Bassa LGA; Bauchi State, Toro LGA		
Jere	C	Jere			Ezelle	Anazele, Azelle	Jengre			4,500 (1936 HDG)	Plateau State, Bassa LGA; Kaduna State, Saminaka LGA		
Ibunu-Lɔrɔ	C	Jere		Bunu	Ìbunu; iLɔrɔ	Ànarubùnu, (Anorubuna, Narabuna); ɔnɔLɔrɔ pl. AnoLɔrɔ	Rebina, Ribina, Rubunu			2,000 (LA 1971); 1500 (Blench 2003) in four villages	Bauchi State, Toro LGA		
Panawa	C	Jere			iPanawa	unuPanawa pl. anaPanawa	Bujiyel			1600 CAPRO (1995a). 3500 (Blench 2003) in five villages	Bauchi State, Toro LGA		
Tunzu	C				one person Tunzú, people àTunzû	ìTunzû	Dugusa, Duguza			2500 speakers (Blench 2003 est.), though there are likely 2000 more ethnic Tunzu who do not speak the language.	Plateau State, Jos East Local Government (5 villages), main settlement at N10˚ 02, E 9˚ 06. Bauchi State, Toro LGA (2 villages)		
Sheni-Ziriya-Kere cluster	C	Sheni-Ziriya-Kere											
Sheni	C	Sheni-Ziriya-Kere		Shani, Shaini	tiSeni	one person onoSeni, people anaSeni				6 fluent speakers remaining out of ethnic community of about 1500 (Blench 2003)	Kaduna State, Lere LGA. Two settlements, Sheni (N10˚ 22.6, E 8˚ 45.9) and Gurjiya (N10˚ 21.5, E 8˚ 45.2)		
Kere (extinct)	C	Sheni-Ziriya-Kere								extinct (Blench 2003)	Kaduna State, Lere LGA. Kere		
Ziriya (extinct)	C	Sheni-Ziriya-Kere		Jiriya						extinct (ethnic community ca. 2000)	Bauchi State: Toro LGA: Ziriya (N10˚ 22.6, E 8˚ 50)		
Nu	Kauru				Tinu	Binu pl. Anu	Kinugu, Kinuka, Kinuku			460 (NAT 1949); 500 (1973 SIL); 3000 (est. 2016). About seven villages	Kaduna State, Saminaka LGA		
Tumi	Kauru				Tutumi		Kitimi			635 (NAT 1949)	Kaduna State, Saminaka LGA	no data	
Bin	Kauru			Bina	tìBin	bìBin pl. áBin		Bogana	Binawa	220 (NAT 1949), 2,000 (1973 SIL). 4 villages (2016) ca. 3-4000 (est.)	Kaduna State, Saminaka LGA. About 15 km west of Mariri, along the Geshere road.		
Gbiri–Niragu cluster	Kauru	Gbiri–Niragu								5,000 (1952 W&B)	Kaduna State, Saminaka LGA		
Gbiri	Kauru	Gbiri–Niragu			Igbiri, Agari, Agbiri		Gura, Gure, Guri						
Niragu	Kauru	Gbiri–Niragu			Anirago, Aniragu		Kafugu, Kagu, Kahugu, Kapugu						
Kurama	Kauru				Tikurumi	Akurumi		Bagwama (also refers to Ruma)		11,300 (NAT 1949)	Kaduna State, Saminaka and Ikara LGAs; Kano State, Tudun Wada LGA		
Ruma	Kauru			Rurama	Turuma	Arumaruma		Bagwama (also refers to Kurama)		2,200 (NAT 1948)	Kaduna State, Saminaka LGA		
Shuwa–Zamani	Kauru										Kaduna State, Saminaka LGA		
Vori	Kauru				TiVori	PiVori pl. AVori	Srubu, Skrubu, Surubu, Zurubu	Fiti		1,950 (NAT 1948)	Kaduna State, Saminaka LGA		
Dungu	Kauru			Dungi, Dingi, Dwingi, Dunjawa						310 (NAT 1949)	Kaduna State, Saminaka LGA	no data	
Kono	Kauru			Konu, Kwono						1,550 (NAT 1949)	Kaduna State, Saminaka LGA	no data	
Mala	Kauru				Tumala	Amala	Rumaya, Rumaiya			1,800 (NAT 1948)	Kaduna State, Saminaka LGA	no data	
Vono	Kauru				Kivɔnɔ	Avɔnɔ		Kibolo, Kiwollo, Kiballo		335 (NAT 1949); 500 (1973 SIL)	Kaduna State, Saminaka LGA	no data	
Kaivi	Kauru			Kaibi						650 (NAT 1949)	Kaduna State, Saminaka LGA	no data	
Gyem	Lame			Gema						2000 (est. 2015)	Bauchi State, Toro LGA, Lame district		
Shau	Lame			Sho	Lìsháù					Almost extinct	Bauchi State, Toro LGA, villages of Shau and Mana		
Kudu–Camo cluster	Ningi	Kudu–Camo	Basa said to be a sub–group							Language moribund, perhaps extinct	Bauchi State, Ningi LGA		
Kudu	Ningi	Kudu–Camo		Kuda						Probably extinct			
Camo	Ningi	Kudu–Camo		Chamo						Probably extinct			
Lemoro	North-Central			Limorro	Emoro	Anemoro	Anowuru			2,950 (1936 HDG)	Plateau State, Bassa LGA; Bauchi State, Toro LGA		
Sanga	North-Central				Aŋma Asanga	Asanga				1,700 (NAT 1950); 5,000 (1973 SIL)	Bauchi State, Toro LGA, Lame district		
Zora	North-Central				iZora	uZora pl. aZora			Cikobu, Chokobo	425 (1936 HDG), 19 speakers (March 2016); 10 settlements close to N10˚ 21.7, E 8˚ 50.6. About 3-4000 ethnic Zora.	Plateau State, Bassa LGA		

== Lexical comparison ==
The following table shows the singular and plural forms for ‘arm, hand’ from various East Kainji language varieties. Names in parentheses are from Williamson (1972). The data has been combined by Blench (2020) from Williamson (1972), Shimizu (1979, 1982), and Blench's unpublished field data.

Language	Cluster	‘arm, hand’	‘arms, hands’
Bishi (Piti)	Southern	moɔk	
Atsam (Chaw)	Southern	wɔk	
Kudu (Kuda)	Ningi	mò-ri	
Camo (Cham)	Ningi	ùkérí	
Gamo (Buta)	Ningi	ù-ʔára	à-ʔára
Gyem (Gyem)	Lame	ò-meᵏ	cè-rèèku
Shau	Lame	u-ʔara	tu-ʔara
Si	Lere	àya	
Gana	Lere	ù-ʔaya	
Takaya (Taur)	Lere	àyà	
Izora	North-central	ù-ʔara	tààra
eMoro	North-central	wàʔara	tàara
Sanga	North-central	ò-ʔàra	tà-ʔàra
Janji (Janj)	North-central	tààre	
εBoze (Buji)	North-central	ò-wàrè	tàre
iZele	North-central	ò-warè	tà-are
iBunu (Ribn)	North-central	ù-wáré	tà-áré
iPanawa	North-central	ù-wáré	tì-wáré
iLoro	North-central	ù-wáré	tàáré
iGuta	North-central	ù-wɨrɨ	tɨ̀-ɨ̀rɨ
tiMap (Amo)	North-central	ù-cárà	à-cárà
Ziriya †	Sheni	àyí	
Sheni (Shen)	Sheni	taya	uta-taya
Gbiri	Kauru	ka-kiara	na-
Niragu	Kauru	ka-ʧara	Kahu
Surubu (Surb)	Kauru	ka-ʧara	na-
Kurama (Krma)	Kauru	tá-áré	tí-
Kono	Kauru	u-cara	i-cara

== See also ==
- List of Proto-Northern Jos reconstructions (Wiktionary)
