= Ruma language =

Kainji language of Nigeria

Ruma
- Turuma
- Native to: Nigeria
- Region: Kaduna State
- Native speakers: (5,100 cited 2000)
- Language family: Niger–Congo?: Atlantic–Congo; Benue–Congo; Kainji; East Kainji; Ruma

Language codes
- ISO 639-3: ruz
- Glottolog: ruma1250
- ELP: Ruma

Ruma
- People: Arumaruma
- Language: Turuma

Ruma (Ruruma) is a Kainji language of Nigeria.
