= Janji language =

Kainji language of Nigeria

Janji
- Tijanji
- Native to: Nigeria
- Region: Plateau State
- Native speakers: (1,200 cited 2000)
- Language family: Niger–Congo?: Atlantic–Congo; Benue–Congo; Kainji; East Kainji; Janji

Language codes
- ISO 639-3: jni
- Glottolog: janj1240
- ELP: Janji

Janji
- Person: Ujanji
- People: Ajanji
- Language: Tijanji

Janji is a Kainji language of Nigeria.

== Numerals ==
Janji has, or had, a duodecimal number system.

1	-nde, dingke
2	-re
3	-taro
4	-naze
5	-chibi
6	-tase
7	-sunare
8	-uro
9	-toroai
A_{12} (10)	-turo
B_{12} (11)	-belum
10_{12} (12)	-kurno, kirau
