= Tunzu language =

Kainji language of Nigeria

Tunzu
- Tunzuii
- Duguza
- Native to: Nigeria
- Region: Plateau State and Bauchi State
- Native speakers: 2,500 (2003)
- Language family: Niger–Congo?: Atlantic–Congo; Benue–Congo; Kainji; East Kainji; ? Shammo; Tunzu

Language codes
- ISO 639-3: dza
- Glottolog: tunz1235
- ELP: Tunzu

Tunzu
- Person: Tunzú
- People: àTunzû
- Language: ìTunzû

Tunzu (Tunzuii), or Itunzu, also known as Duguza (Dugusa) in Hausa, is a Kainji language of Nigeria.

== Demographics ==
The Tunzu people live in 7 villages. There are 5 villages (including the main settlement of Gada) in Jos East LGA, Plateau State and 2 villages (Kurfi and Magama) in Toro LGA, Bauchi State. The Tunzu villages in Bauchi State are assimilated into Hausa culture. There were 2,500 speakers (2003 estimate), although there might be 2,000 more ethnic Tunzu who do not speak the Tunzu language.
