= Kurama language =

Kainji language of Nigeria

Kurama
- T'kurmi
- Native to: Nigeria
- Region: Kano and Kaduna states
- Native speakers: (40,000 cited 2000)
- Language family: Niger–Congo?: Atlantic–Congo; Benue–Congo; Kainji; East Kainji; Kurama

Language codes
- ISO 639-3: krh
- Glottolog: kura1249

Kurmi
- Person: Bukurmi
- People: Akurmi
- Language: T'kurmi

The Kurama or T'kurmi or Akurmi language is a Kainji language of Nigeria. Kurama speakers are found in the central northern Nigerian states of Kaduna, Bauchi, Borno, Kano, Jigawa and Plateau.

88% of the population of the Akurmi people are Christians.
