= Gusu language =

East Kainji language spoken in Nigeria

Gusu
- Baw
- Native to: Nigeria
- Region: Toro, Bauchi State and Bassa, Plateau State
- Native speakers: (2,350 cited 1936)
- Language family: Niger–Congo?: Atlantic–Congo; Benue–Congo; Kainji; East Kainji; Shammo; Gusu

Language codes
- ISO 639-3: –
- Glottolog: gusu1242

Baw
- Person: onoBaw
- People: aniBaw
- Language: iBaw

Gusu (Gussum, Baw) is an East Kainji language of Nigeria belonging to the Shammo cluster. It is spoken in Toro LGA, Bauchi State and in Bassa LGA, Plateau State.
