= Tumi language =

Kainji language spoken in Nigeria

Tumi
- Native to: Nigeria
- Region: Kaduna State
- Native speakers: (2,300 cited 2000)
- Language family: Niger–Congo?: Atlantic–Congo; Benue–Congo; Kainji; East Kainji; Tumi

Language codes
- ISO 639-3: kku
- Glottolog: tumi1238
- ELP: Tumi

Tumi (also Tutumi. Hausa: Kitimi) is a Kainji language of Nigeria.
