= Kinuku language =

Kainji language of Nigeria

Kinuku
- Nu
- Tinu
- Native to: Nigeria
- Region: Kaduna State
- Native speakers: 3,000 (2016)
- Language family: Niger–Congo?: Atlantic–Congo; Benue–Congo; Kainji; East Kainji; Kinuku

Language codes
- ISO 639-3: kkd
- Glottolog: kinu1239

Nu
- Person: Binu
- People: Anu
- Language: Tinu

Kinuku (Nu) is a Kainji language of Nigeria.
