= Mala language (Nigeria) =

Kainji language spoken in Nigeria

Mala
- Rumaya
- Tumala
- Native to: Nigeria
- Region: Kaduna State
- Native speakers: (6,600 cited 2000)
- Language family: Niger–Congo?: Atlantic–Congo; Benue–Congo; Kainji; East Kainji; Mala

Language codes
- ISO 639-3: ruy
- Glottolog: mala1471
- ELP: Mala

Mala
- People: Amala
- Language: Tumala

Mala (Tumala, Amala), also known as Rumaya, is a Kainji language of Nigeria.
