= Sanga language (Nigeria) =

East Kainji language of Nigeria

Sanga
- Isanga
- Native to: Nigeria
- Region: Bauchi State
- Native speakers: (20,000 cited 2000)
- Language family: Niger–Congo?: Atlantic–Congo; Benue–Congo; Kainji; East Kainji; Shammo; Sanga

Language codes
- ISO 639-3: xsn
- Glottolog: sang1329

Sanga
- Person: Osanga
- People: Asanga
- Language: Isanga

Sanga is an East Kainji language of Nigeria belonging to the Shammo cluster.

== Distribution ==
Sanga is spoken about 20 villages of Toro LGA, Bauchi State and Jema'a LGA, Kaduna State.

- Akora
- Ana Kataki
- Anaka’awa
- Anakapɔ
- Barko
- Didim
- Gagate
- Galma
- Gumau
- Jee
- Jimbiri
- Kajanta
- Kajole
- Kasheeno
- Kudeenu
- Magami
- Majango
- Maleera
- Nabarka
- Shimba I, II
- Shimbiri
