= Guta people =

Ethnic group in Plateau State, Nigeria

Anaguta
Total population
- >10,000 (2010)

Regions with significant populations
- Plateau State (Nigeria)

Languages
- Iguta

Religion
- Christianity

Related ethnic groups
- Afizere, Berom, Irigwe, Buji, Rukuba, Ham, Jukun and other Platoid peoples of the Middle Belt, Tiv, Igbo, Yoruba, Edo, Efik and other Benue-Congo peoples of southern Nigeria

The Guta people, or Anaguta, is a minority ethnic group in Plateau State of Nigeria. Anaguta means "People of the Bow", the bow and their homes on the hills being the core symbols of their identity.

Anaguta ancestral lands are all located on high ground on the Jos plateau.

== Chiefdom ==
The traditional title of their paramount chief is called UJAH. The current king is Johnson Jauro Magaji II Ujah Anaguta Jos North (Head of Jos north Traditional Council of Chiefs).

The Anaguta chiefdom is made up of five clans: Anabor, Andoho, Anagohom, andugom, and Andirgiza.

== Notable people ==
- Emmanuel Maviram, Nigerian footballer.
