= Zele language =

Kainji language spoken in Nigeria

Zele
- Jere
- Native to: Nigeria
- Region: Bassa LGA, northern Plateau State
- Native speakers: (23,000 cited 1972)
- Language family: Niger–Congo?: Atlantic–Congo; Benue–Congo; Kainji; East Kainji; Zele

Language codes
- ISO 639-3: jer
- Glottolog: nucl1376

Zele
- Person: oZele
- People: aZele
- Language: eZele

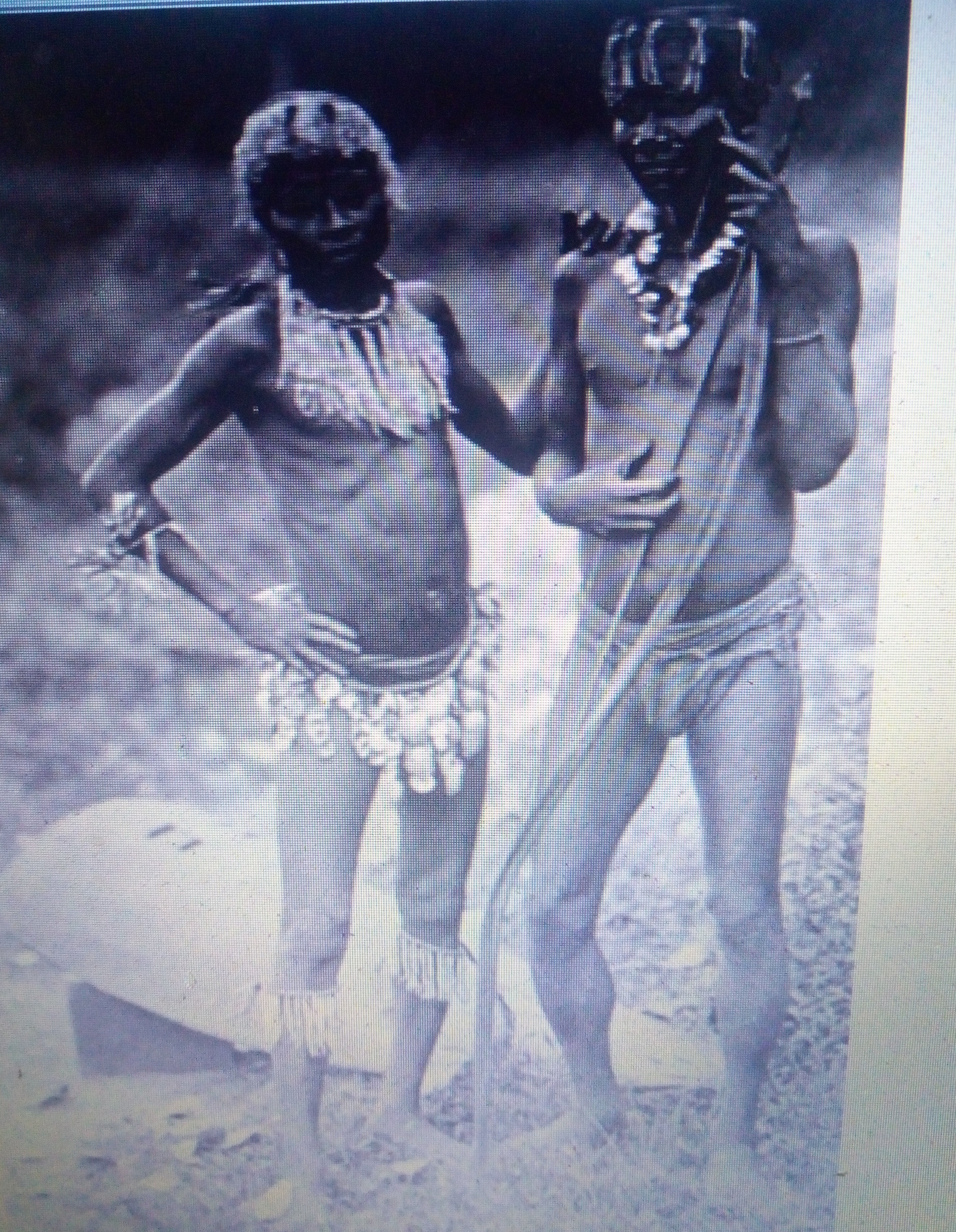
Jere men in 1880

Zele (Zelle, Jere, Jera) is an East Kainji language of Bassa LGA in northern Plateau State, Nigeria.
