= Bina language =

Kainji language spoken in Nigeria

Bina
- tìBin
- Native to: Nigeria
- Region: Kaduna State
- Native speakers: (7,000 cited 2000)
- Language family: Niger–Congo?: Atlantic–Congo; Benue–Congo; Kainji; East Kainji; Bina

Language codes
- ISO 639-3: byj
- Glottolog: bina1270
- ELP: Bina

Bin
- Person: bìBin
- People: áBin
- Language: tìBin

Bina (Hausa: Binawa) is a Kainji language of Nigeria.
