= Kono language (Nigeria) =

Kainji language of Nigeria

Kono
- Koonu
- Native to: Nigeria
- Region: Kaduna State
- Native speakers: (5,500 cited 2000)
- Language family: Niger–Congo?: Atlantic–Congo; Benue–Congo; Kainji; East Kainji; Kono

Language codes
- ISO 639-3: klk
- Glottolog: kono1264
- ELP: Kono

Kono (also Koonu) is a Kainji language of Nigeria.
