= Ce language =

Plateau language spoken in Nigeria

Ce
- Rukuba
- Kuce
- Native to: Nigeria
- Region: Plateau State
- Native speakers: 100,000 (2003)
- Language family: Niger–Congo?: Atlantic–Congo; Benue–Congo; Plateau; Ninzic; Ce

Language codes
- ISO 639-3: ruk
- Glottolog: chee1238

Che
- Person: Ache
- People: Bache
- Language: Kuche

The Ce (Che) language, Kuce (Kuche), is a regionally important Plateau language of Nigeria. It is also known by the name of its native district in Plateau State, Rukuba.
