= Karai-karai =

Nigerian language spoken in West Africa

- كاراي-كاراي (Ajami)
- Native to: Nigeria
- Region: Bauchi State, Yobe State, Gombe State
- Ethnicity: Karai-Karai
- Native speakers: 100,000 to 200,000 (2020)
- Language family: Afro-Asiatic: Chadic; West Chadic; Bole–Angas; Bole–Tangale (A.2); Bole (North); Karai-karai
- Writing system: Latin (Karai-karai alphabet); Arabic script (formerly)

Official status
- Official language in: Nigeria

Language codes
- ISO 639-3: kai
- Glottolog: kare1348
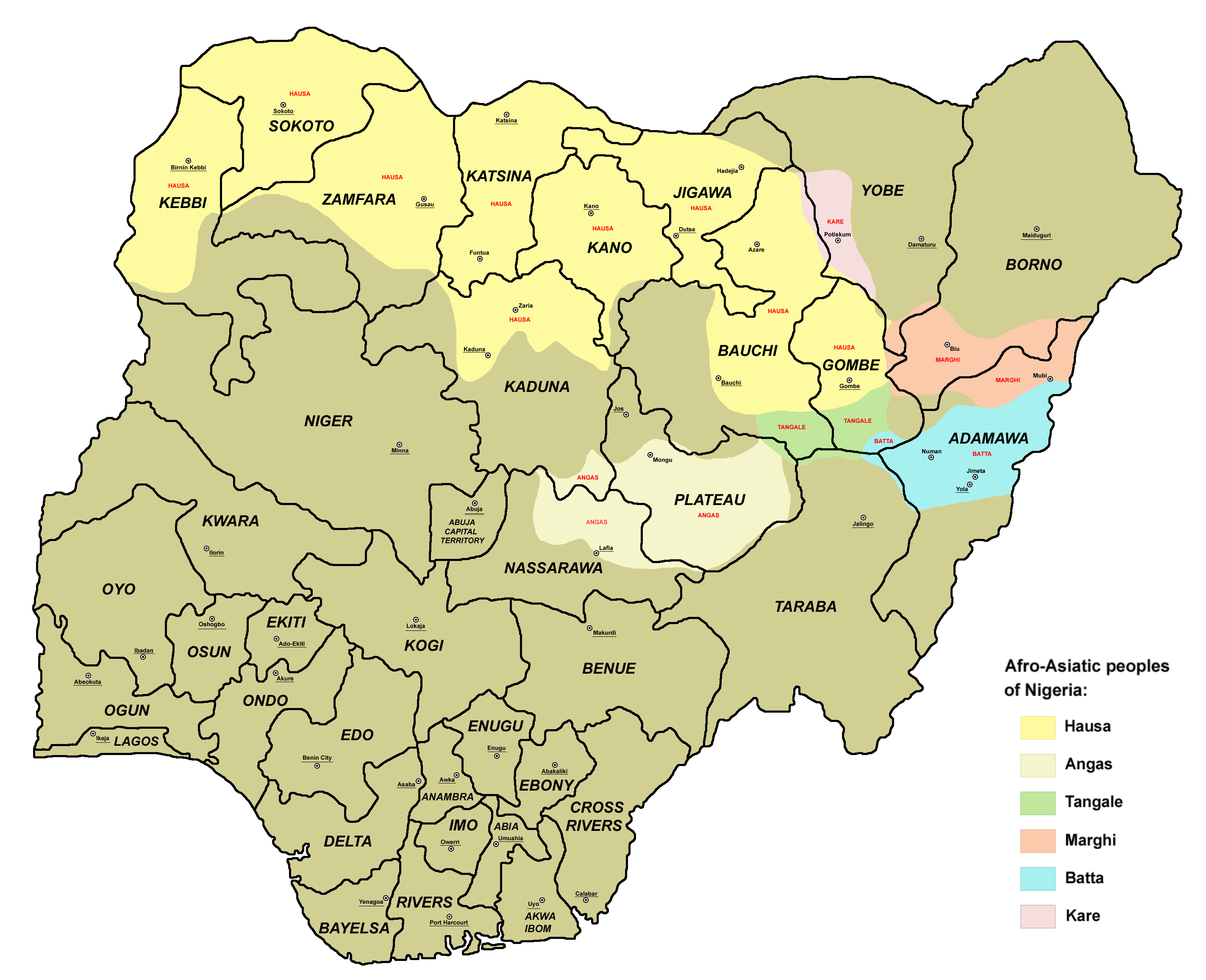
- Ethnic territories (pink) of the Karai-karai-speaking people (Bakwaró) in Nigeria

Karai-karai (Francophonic spelling: Karekare, Kerrikerri, Ajami: كاراي-كاراي) is a language spoken in West Africa, most prominently North eastern Nigeria. The number of speakers of Karai-karai is estimated between 100,000 and 200,000 thousand, primarily spoken by the ethnic Karai-Karai people. It is an Afro-Asiatic language spoken principally in Nigeria with communities in Bauchi State, Yobe State, Gombe State and other parts of Nigeria. Many Karai-karai words share a common origin with the Northwest Semitic languages of Hebrew and Arabic. The Karai-karai language is most closely related to the Ngamo and Bole languages (spoken in north eastern Nigeria) which are both considered derivatives of the Karai-karai language.

== Distribution ==
Karai-karai (and its dialects) is a well-spoken language in the following northern Nigerian states:

- Bauchi State
- Yobe State
- Borno State
- Gombe State
- Taraba State
- Adamawa State
- Jigawa State
- Kano State
- Nasarawa State

== Classification ==
Karai-karai is classified among the Bole-Tangale languages, together with Bure, Deno, Gero, Geruma, Galambu, Giiwo, Kubi, Maaka, Ɓeele, Daza, Pali, Ngamo, Bole and the isolate Tangale form the BoleTangale group of languages within the West Chadic branch of the Chadic family.

== Bole-Tangale languages ==
Below is a comprehensive list of Bole–Tangale languages names, populations, and locations from Blench (2019). It is the subgroup which the Karai-karai language belongs

	Language	Cluster	Dialects	Alternate spellings	Own name for language	Endonym(s)	Other names (location-based)	Other names for language	Exonym(s)	Speakers
Daza			Daza						a few villages (Note: No data available)	Bauchi State, Darazo LGA
Bole		Bara, Fika (Fiyankayen, Anpika)		Bòò Pìkkà, Bopika	Am Pìkkà, Ampika	Fika, Piika	Bolanci	Anika, Bolewa	32,000 (1952 W&B); est. >100,000 (1990)	Bauchi State, Dukku, Alkaleri, and Darazo LGAs; Borno State, Fika LGA
Bure				BuBure	Bure		Bure		A single village southeast of Darazo town	Bauchi State, Darazo LGA
Ɓeele			Bele	Àɓéelé	bòhé áɓéelé sg., Àɓéelé pl.		Bellawa		120 (Temple 1922); a few villages	Bauchi State
Deno									9,900 (LA 1971)	Bauchi State, Darazo LGA; 45 km northeast of Bauchi town
Galambu			Galembi, Galambe	Galambu	Galambu				8505 (Temple 1922); 2020 (Meek 1925); 1000 (SIL)	Bauchi State, Bauchi LGA, at least 15 villages
Dera		Shani, Shellen and Gasi		Bo Dera	na Dera sg., Dera pl.	Kanakuru			11,300 (W&B)	Adamawa State, Shellen LGA; Borno State, Shani LGA
Fyandigeri				Fyandigere	sg. laa Fyandigeri, pl. Fyandigeri			Gerawa, Gere, Gera	13,300 (LA 1971); at least 30 villages. Many Gera villages no longer speak the language. A 2018 survey suggested there are only 4 villages where the language is being passed on to children.	Bauchi State, Bauchi and Darazo LGAs
Geruma		Sum, Duurum, possibly Gamsawa/Gamshi (Temple)	Gerema, Germa	Geerum (Duurum dialect); Gyeermu (Sum dialect)	Geerum (Duurum dialect); sg. na Gyeermu, pl. Gyeermu (Sum dial.)				4,700 (LA 1971)	Bauchi State, Toro and Darazo LGAs. At least 10 villages
Giiwo			Kirifi	Bu Giiwo	sg. Ba Giiwo, pl. Ma Giiwo				3,620 (1922 Temple); 14,000 (SIL)	Bauchi State, Alkaleri, Bauchi and Darazo LGAs, 24 villages
Karai-karai		Western Jalalúm, northern Bíŕkaí, southern Pakaró (Pakaráu)/Matací and eastern Ngwajum	Kәrekәre, Kerekere, Karaikarai, Kerikeri	Bo Karai-karai	Sg. Bakarkare, Pl. Karaikarai	Jalamawa	Karkanci, Karekaranci, Bo Saban	Bakwaráu, Bakwaró	1,000,000 (2005)	Bauchi State; Dambam, Gamawa and Misau LGAs; Yobe State; Nangere, Potiskum, Fune and Fika LGAs Gombe State; Nafada and Deba LGAs
Kholok						Kode, Koode, Kwoode, Widala, Pia, Wurkum, Pitiko			2,500 (1977 Voegelin & Voegelin)	Taraba State, Karim Lamido LGA, near Didango
Kubi			Kuba						1,090 (1922 Temple); 500 (1973 SIL)	Bauchi State, Darazo LGA, 40 km. N.E. of Bauchi town
Kulung (Chadic)				Kulung (speakers consider themselves Kulung i.e. Jarawan Bantu, although their language is Chadic and related to Piya)		Wurkum			2000?	Taraba State, Karim Lamido LGA
Kutto			Kupto	Kúttò	Kúttò				Two villages. 3000 (1990 est.)	Bauchi State, Bajoga LGA, Yobe State, Gujba LGA
Maaka		Two dialects; Maaka (at Gulani) and Maha (at Vara)	Magha, Maga, Maha						More than 4,000 (1990)	Yobe State, Gujba LGA. Gulani and Bara towns and associated hamlets. Northeast of Dadin Kowa Reservoir.
Ngamo			Gamo						17,800 (1952 W&B)	Borno State, Fika LGA; Bauchi State, Darazo LGA, Darazo district and Dukku LGA, Nafada district
Pero		Dialects associated with three major settlements	Walo	Péerò	sg. Péerò, pl. Pìpéerò	Filiya [town name]			6,664 (1925 Meek); 20,000 (1973 SIL)	Gombe State, Shongom LGA, around Filiya. 3 main villages: Gwandum, Gundale and Filiya.
Piya–Kwonci cluster	Piya–Kwonci		Pia			Wurkum, Pitiko			2,500 (1977 Voegelin & Voegelin)	Taraba State, Karim Lamido LGA, near Didango
Piya	Piya–Kwonci		Pia			Wurkum				
Kwonci	Piya–Kwonci	Kunshenu							More than 4000 (1990)	
Goji				Fo Goji	Nya Goji pl. Memme Goji	Kushe, Kushi	Chong'e		4000 (1973 SIL); 5000 (1990). ca. 20 villages (2007)	Gombe State, Shongom LGA
Kwaami		Kafarati, Ɗolli	Kwami, Kwom	Kwáámì	Kwáámì	Komawa			10,000 (1990)	Bauchi State, Kwami LGA
Nyam					Nyambolo				A single village	Taraba State, Karim Lamido LGA, at Andami village
Tangale		Ture, Kaltungo, Shongom, Billiri	Tangle	Táŋlɛ̀		Billiri			36,000 (1952 W&B); 100,000 (1973 SIL)	Gombe State, Kaltungo, Alkaleri and Akko LGAs

== Literary Karai-karai ==
Standard Karai-karai has its origin in the 1950s, when Northern Region Literary Agency (NORLA) worked on the book Ndar Ma Karatu which is the earliest publication in Karai-karai published by Gaskiya Corporation.

== Writing system ==
=== Alphabets ===
Karai-karai language is written with the basic Latin script, with four diacritics appearing on vowels (circumflex accent, acute accent, grave accent) and the cedilla appearing in "ç" and "ş". The Latin letters ⟨q⟩, ⟨v⟩, ⟨x⟩ are not used as part of the official orthography of Standard Karai-karai.

Karai-karai Alphabets
Capital Letters	A	B	Ɓ	C	D	Ɗ	E	G	H	I	J	K	Ƙ	L	M	N	O	P	R	R̃	S	Ş	T	U	W	ʼW	Y	ʼY	Z
Small Letters	a	b	ɓ	c	d	ɗ	e	g	h	i	j	k	ƙ	l	m	n	o	p	r	r̃	s	ş	t	u	w	ʼw	y	ʼy	z

=== Orthography ===
- Digraphs: dl, hn, tl, zh, lh, lz, zh, sh, ny, nz, nd, nt, nc, nk, nj, ng, mp, mb. mɓ, kw, gw, ƙw, zh, sh.
- Trigraphs: nlz, nzh, ngw, nkw
- Accents: à, â, á, ā, è, ê, é, ē, ì, í, ī, î, ò, ō, ó, ù, ū, ú, ā̀, ḕ, ī̀, ṑ, ū̀, ā́, ḗ, ī́, ṓ, ū́.

=== Vowels ===
The Karai-karai language has five long vowels, a, e, i, o, u and five long vowels [a:, e:, i:, o:, and u:] these five long vowels are written as ā, ē, ī, ō, ū or with double letters as follows: aa, ee, ii, oo, and uu as used by some dialects.

The diphthongs: au and ai.

== See also ==
- Gooya Valley
