= Karai-Karai people =

Ethnic group in Nigeria

Karai-Karai
Total population
- 439,000

Regions with significant populations
- Bauchi State; (Dambam, Misau, Shira, Darazo and Gamawa LGAs); Yobe State; (Potiskum, Nangere, Gujba, Jakusko, Fika and Fune LGAs); Gombe State and Jigawa State

Languages
- Native: Karai-Karai; Second Languages: Hausa, English, Kanuri

Religion
- Islam; Minor:Christianity

Related ethnic groups
- Bure, Deno, Gero, Geruma, Galambu, Giiwo, Kubi, Maaka, Ɓeele, Daza, Pali, Ngamo, Bole, Hausa

The Karai-Karai (autonyms for singular: Bakarkarai (m), Bakarkariya (f); plural: Karai-Karai and general: Karai-Karai; exonyms: Karekare, Kerrikerri, Kare-kare, Karedu; Ajami: كاراي-كاراي) are a native ethnic group in the north-eastern region of Nigeria, West Africa. They speak the Karai-Karai language, a member of the West Branch of the Chadic languages under the Bole-Tangale languages (north) group of the Afro-Asiatic language family. The Karai-Karai are a culturally homogeneous people based primarily in the Karai-Karai land, an area across the borderlands of Bornu, Kano and Bauchi provinces which in the modern day comprises the Bauchi State, Gombe State, Yobe State and Jigawa State respectively.

According to Annals of Borno, Karai-karai people are the thirty-third largest ethnic group in Nigeria. They traditionally live in small villages as well as in precolonial towns and cities where they grow crops, raise livestock including cattle, hunting as well as engage in local trades, they are also skillful craftsmen. The craft includes wood-carving, weaving, metal work, painting and barbing. They speak the Karai-Karai language, an Afro-Asiatic language of the Chadic group.

== Ethnonyms ==
The term Karai is derived from the Kanuri word for 'goods' or 'things', the term was used by Kanuri peope to refer the Karai-Karai people by their distinctive habits of carrying their goods on shoulders while travelling and during their migrations. Some also see the name as being derived from the word "kere", i.e. a throwing stick, perhaps because the Karai-Karai people are well known for using it in hunting. They are also called "Karaidu Goyon Fata" by their neighbours due their women unique way of using leather skins for carrying their babies on the back as a traditional practice, a term known as babywearing.

== Population and demography ==
According to the census figure of 1952, Karai-Karai people were estimated about 39,000 to 50,000. While the 1963 census of the population revealved that 221,256 was the total number of population of the entire people living in Nangere, Fika and Potiskum districts out of which Karai-Karai people number over 129,000 making them the 33rd largest ethnic group in Nigeria. Some figures also revealed that the Karai-Karai population is estimated around 426,000–439,000 with 93% of which are Muslim, <2% - 5% evangelist and 5% Christians. While Ethnologue gives the population of Karai-Karai numbered around 10,000–1,000,000.

McEwan noted that the majority of the Karai-Karai people lived in scattered groups across the borderland of Bornu, Kano and Bauchi. The language can be divided into three dialects; Jalalum (western Karai-Karai), Pakaro (North Karai-Karai), Ngwajum (East Karai-Karai).

== History ==
=== Origin ===
The Karai-Karai people hailed from Kisra, a settlement in the Middle East and they migrated from Yemen through Fustat (Cairo) in Egypt where their ancestors found groundnut and named it after the place, "Dibeerau ta Masar" (the nut of Egypt). They then moved south-wards to Sudan were they stayed in Kukia (Khartoum) and lived there for forty years with their leader Aliyu, the son of Haibara, and then moved to Ngazargamu and Kupto, both in the then Kanem-Bornu Empire, where they lived together with other tribes including; Gobirarawa, Maguzawa, Kanuri, the people of Damagaram, Tangale, Lunguda, Sao, Tera, Waja, Bolewa, Songom and other neighbouring tribes.

Historically, Jalam in the present day Bauchi State, northern Nigeria, is the headquarters of the Karai-Karai settlements. The town was founded after the collapse of Mir, which forced the Karai-Karai people and other tribes to disperse. It was during that time that the Gobirawa (Hausa) founded Daura, the oldest city of Hausaland. The Kanuri founded Teshena and the Karai-Karai people founded Jalam, Shira and Kalam, and the cities were completely formed by 1500.

=== The Karai-Karai Land ===
The Karai-Karai land in 1810

The Karai-Karai established a state named after their tribal name and what the British historians referred to as the "Kare-Kare country". According to the historical accounts collected by Fremantle in 1911, the Karai-Karai land was founded around 997 years before the outbreak of the Jihad in Hausaland in 1804, suggesting that the people migrated into the settlement and founded their first ancient cities including Shira and Jalam around 970 AD.

Writing in 1939, Crowker noted that, the Karai-Karai lived as an independent tribe in the Pre-British days where they lived in a no man’s land between the big Emirates, and they had never been subjugated. According to Patrick, Low’s map of 1972 showed the location of this Karai-Karai land as being split between Katagum, Misau and Fika emirates. Clapperton also documented that, it took him five days from Katagum emirate to reached the Karai-Karai's independent land which is named after the people.

== Subgroups ==
The Karai-Karai people in the narrow sense are indigenous of Karai-Karai land who are found in Nigeria. Within the Karai-Karai, a distinction is made between three subgroups:

- Jalaalìm
- Birkài
- Pakaràu (Pakarò)

=== Jalaalìm ===
There are the twelve (12) tribes of Jalam, they are regarged as the western Karai-karai clans of the Jalaalìm subgroup. Although they were never conquered by the raiders of Danfodiyo revolution (Jihad) of 1804, these groups were later influenced by the traditional ruling system of the Sokoto caliphate. They include;

- Ndalàa Dòokun
- Ndalàa Gaucáu
- Ndalàa Gamarun
- Ndalàa Baagau
- Ndalàa Indí
- Ndalàa Diiwau
- Ndalàa Bureeeni
- Ndalàa Cállaa
- Ndalàa Kúrfa
- Ndalàa Fíyelí
- Ndalàa Gazgawài
- Ndalàa Cállaa mà Gurdùgurù

== Gallery ==
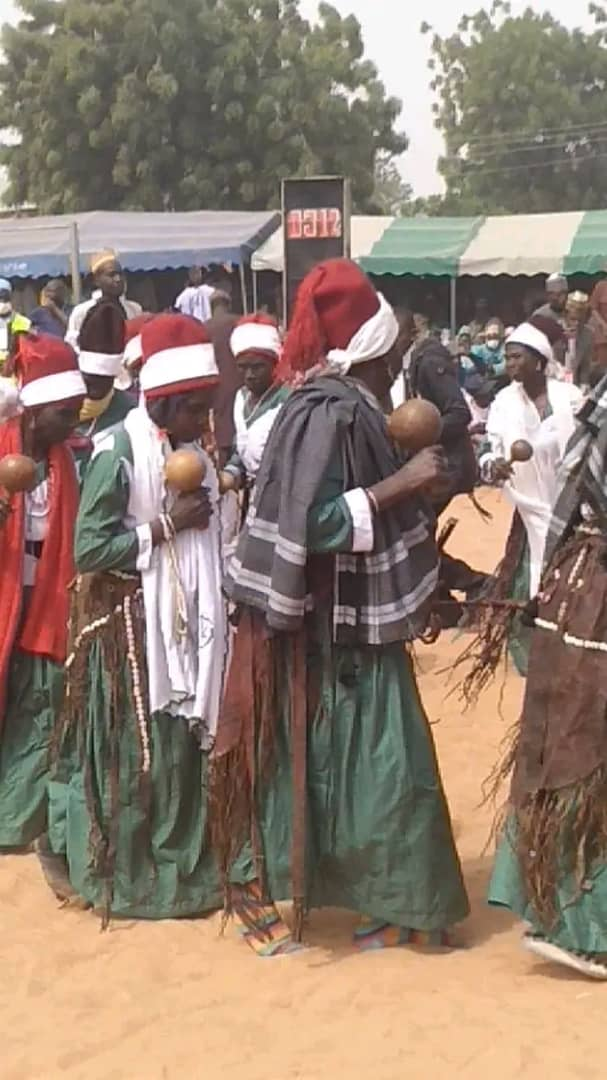
Bala Bara Majalam is festival of a Karai-karai ethnic group's of Jalam town Yobe State 2024

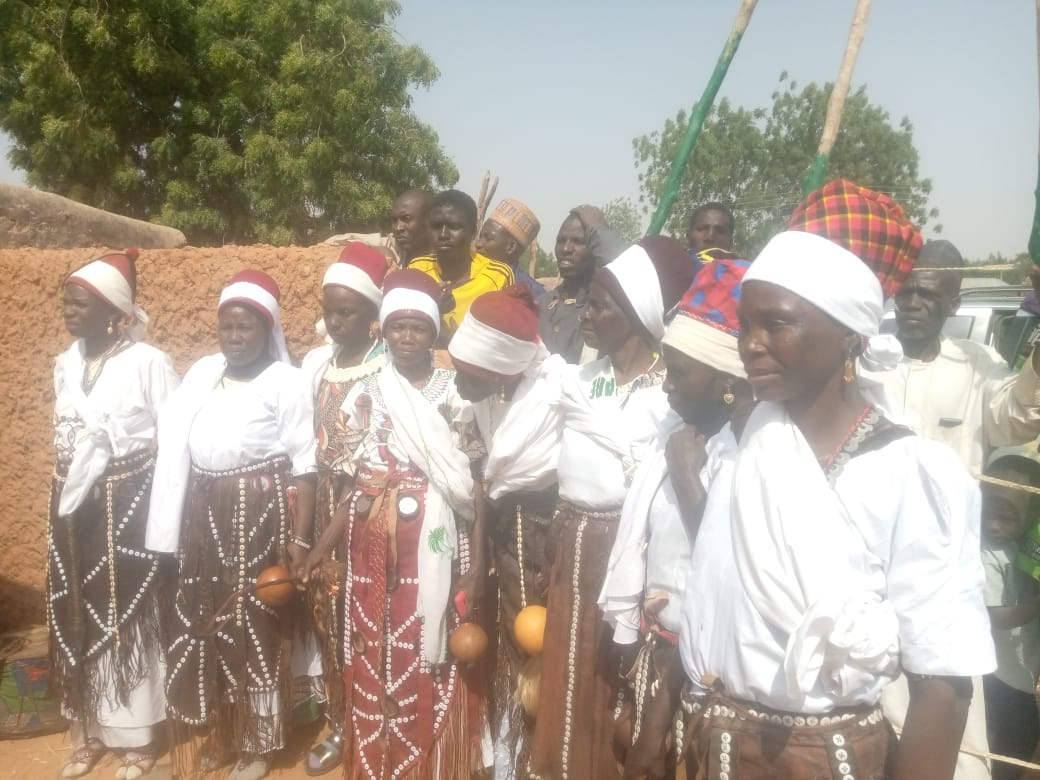

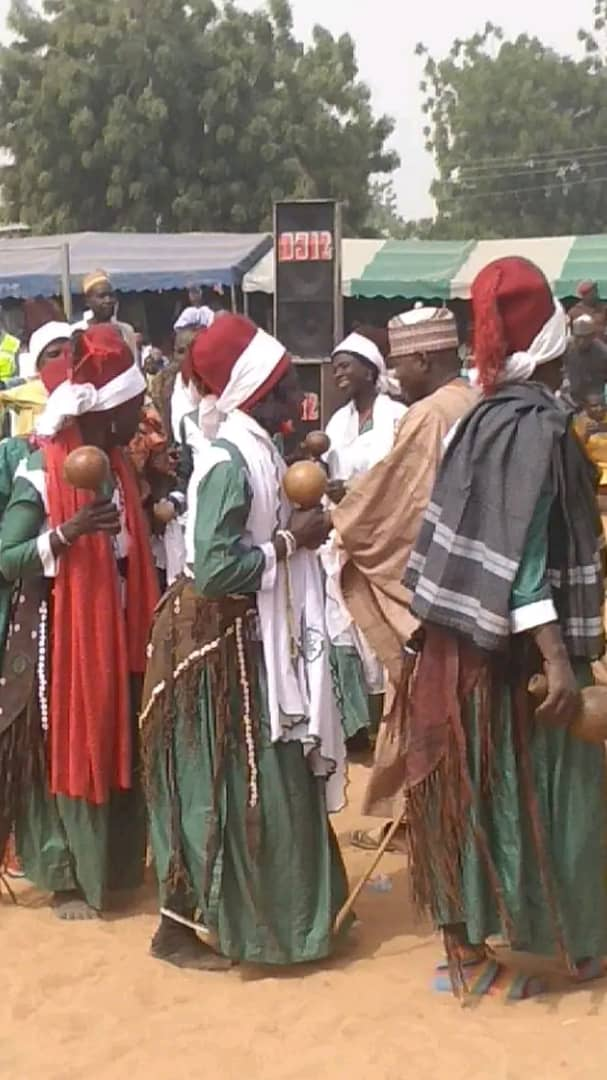

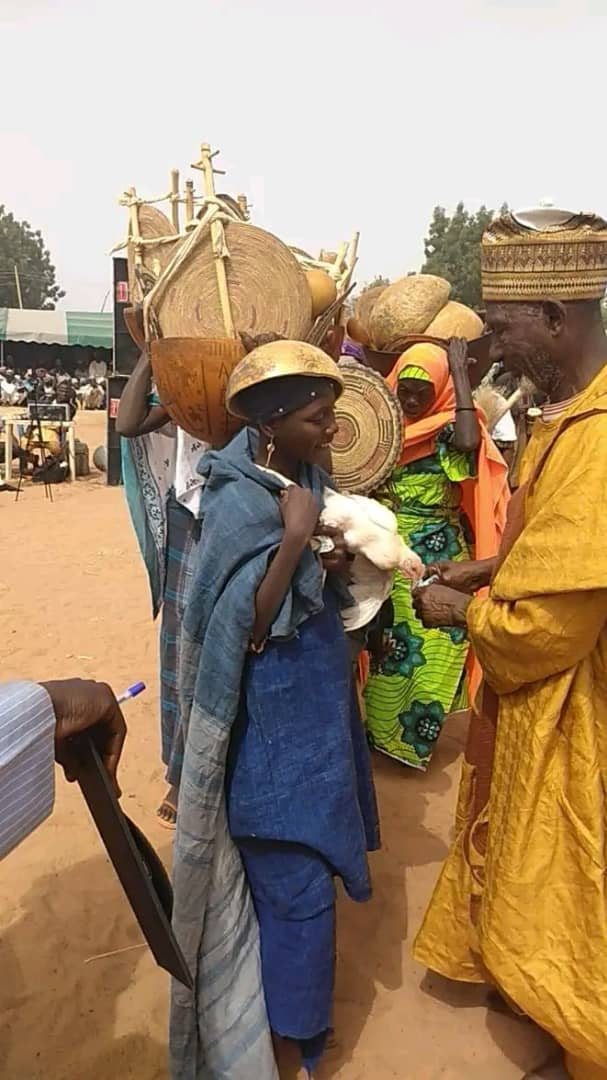

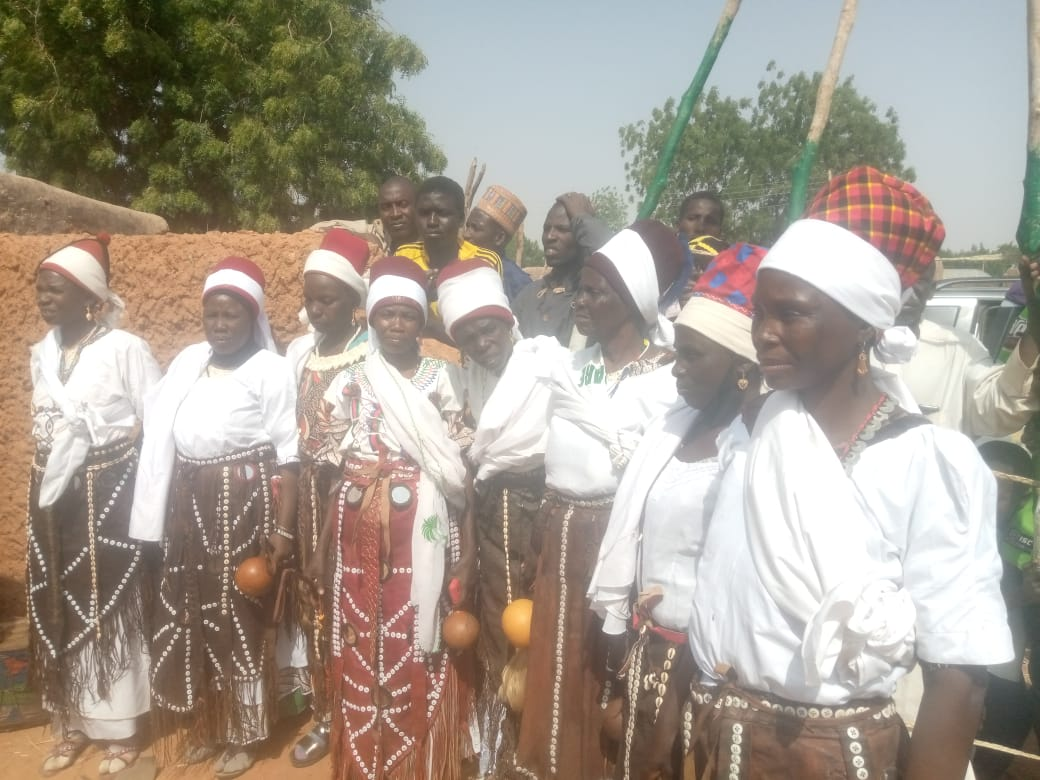

== Notable Karai-Karai people ==
- Idi Barde Gubana, deputy governor of Yobe State.
- Adamu Garba Talba, former senator
- Fatima Talba, former commissioner and member House of Representatives
- Musa Lawan, Nigerian politician and chieftain
- Aliyu Saleh Bagare, former deputy governor of Yobe State
- Ahmed Aliyu Jalam, politician and former commissioner in Bauchi State
- Hassan Jonga, former member House of Representatives
