= Kode language =

Kode language may refer to either one of two languages spoken by the Kode people of Taraba State, Nigeria.

- Kholok, a West Chadic language (Afroasiatic phylum)
- Maghdi, an Adamawa language (Niger–Congo phylum)
