= Gadaka =

- Town
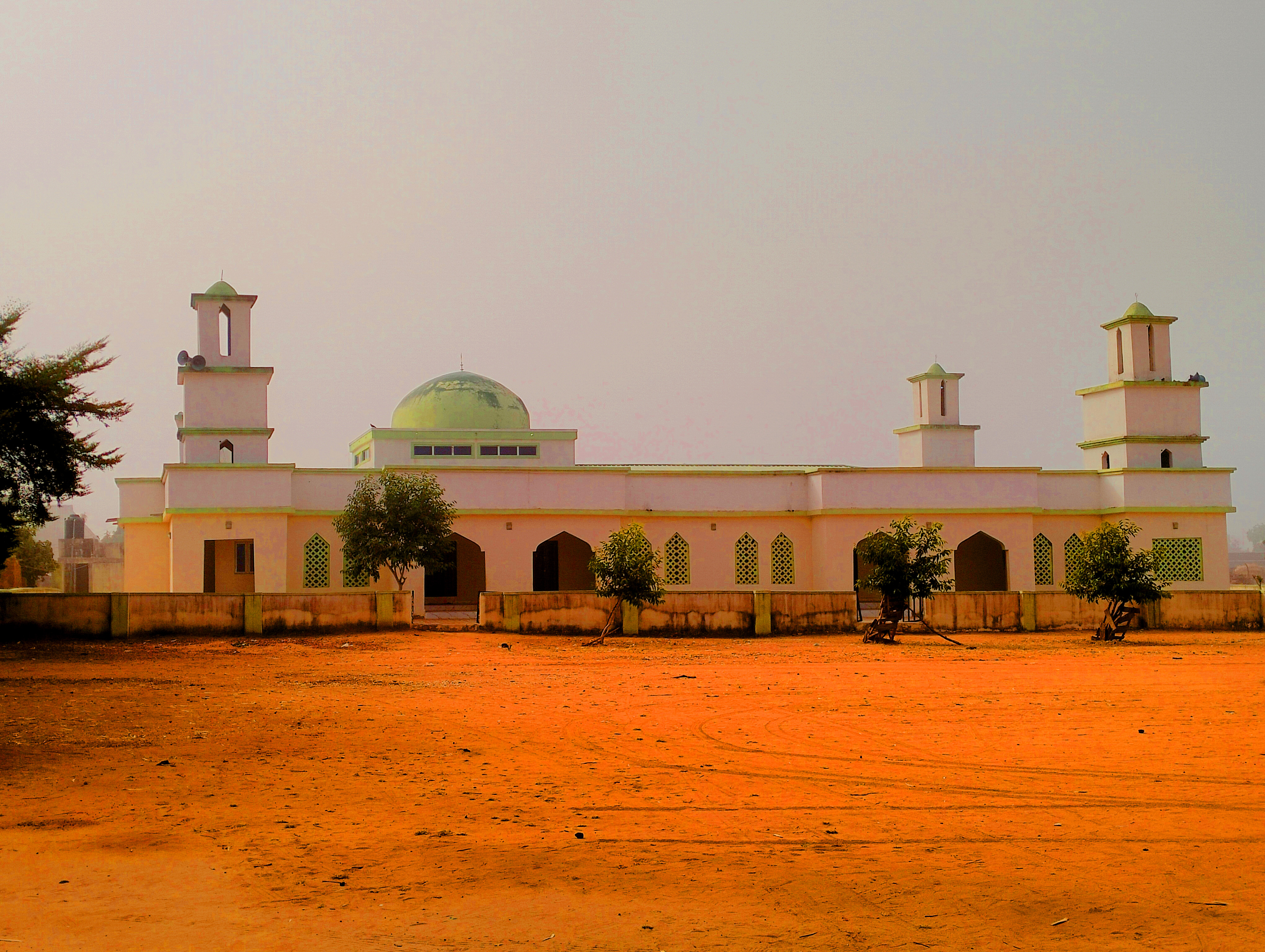
- Gudi Emirate Central Mosque in Gadaka town

- Location in Nigeria
- Coordinates: 11°18′N 11°14′E
- Country: Nigeria
- State: Yobe State
- LGA: Fika
- Elevation: 452 m (1,483 ft)
- Time zone: UTC+1 (WAT)

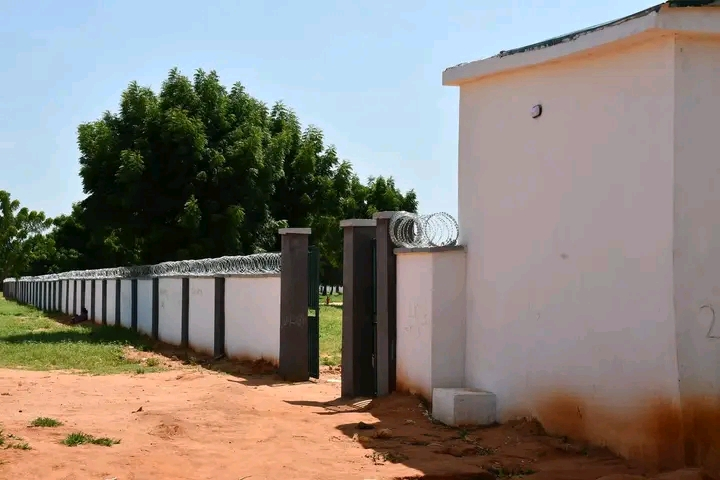
moi Ganga primary school in gadaka

Gadaka is a town in Yobe State, Nigeria, with a population of over 70,000 people. It is located in the southern part of the state, near the boundary with Gombe and Bauchi states. It used to be the capital of the defunct Gadaka Local Government Area, created by Shehu Shagari's administration. It is the largest town in the Fika Local Government Area. Located at about 12 kilometres (7.5 mi) off the Potiskum-Gombe main road, Gadaka town is about 67 kilometres (42 mi) from the commercial city of Potiskum and 137 kilometres (85 mi) from Gombe, the Gombe State capital.

== Geography ==
The county elevation is about 452 metres (1,483 feet). The hottest months are March and April with temperature ranges of 38–40 °C (100–104 °F). In the rainy season, May–September, temperatures fall to 23–28 °C (73–82 °F), with rainfall of 700 to 1,200 millimetres (28 to 47 inches). The westward monsoonal wind marks the end of the rainy season. Vegetation cover is mostly grass and is green only during the rainy season, which dries at the onset of the harmattan.

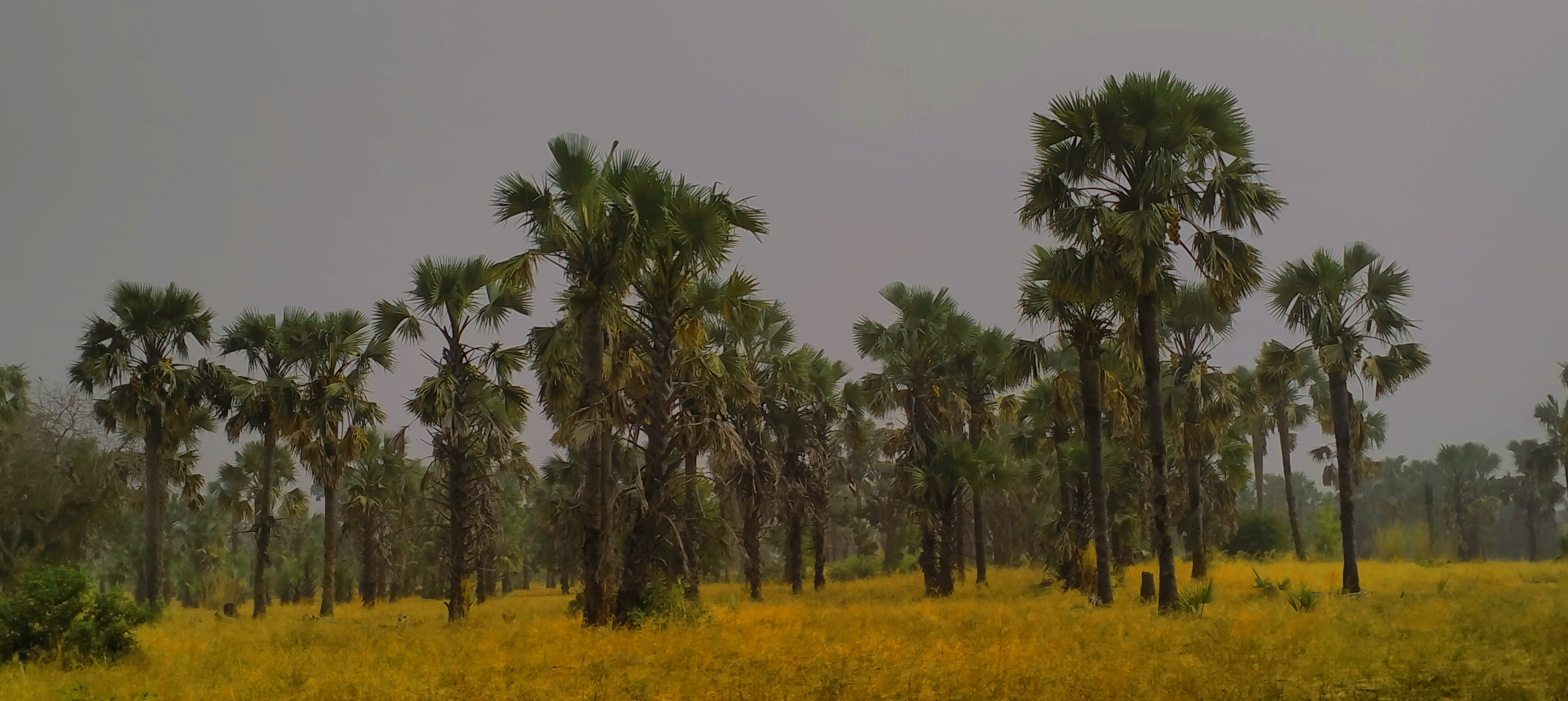
Doum Palm Trees found in Gadaka town

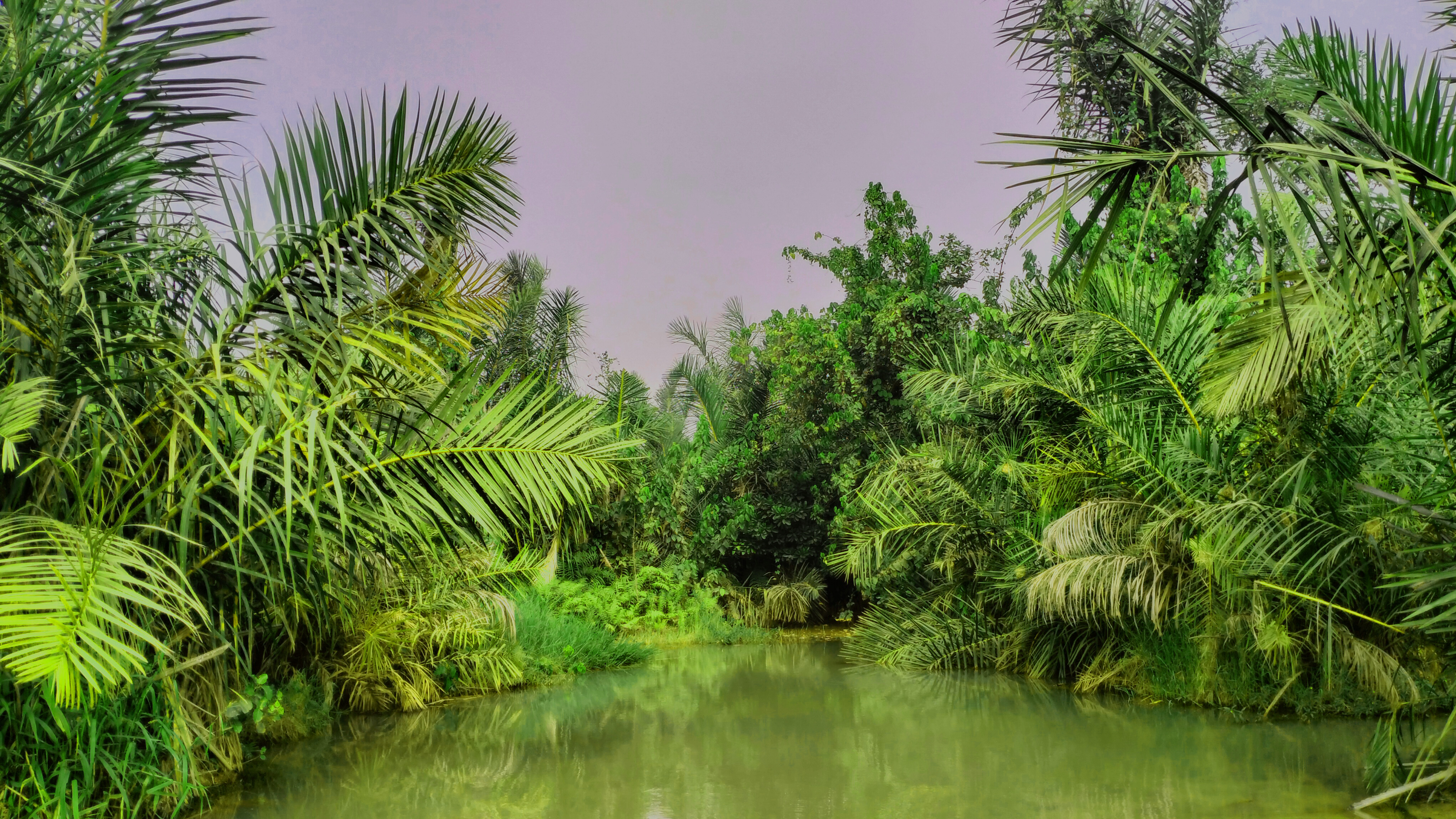
A side view of the Ngeji River in Gadaka

== Economy ==
Gadaka is predominantly an agricultural town. Soils are mostly sandy-loamy and humus, rich in manure and elements that support plant growth. Cultivation intensity stands at 75% cultivated, whereas the remaining 25% is covered by natural vegetation. Farm produce, such as groundnuts, beans, guinea corn, maize, and millet, is produced in commercial quantities. The Ngeji river in the western part of the town has rich fishing in places and also serves as the major source of water for irrigation. Crops such as rice, tomatoes, onion, pepper, eggplants, Cocoayam and sugarcane are cultivated year-round in areas along the river bank. Mineral resources found in the area of Gadaka include limestone, gypsum, kaolin, phosphate, bentonite and quartz.

Transportation is mainly by road; global communication networking from Gadaka Town is via mobile telephone. Internet access is possible either through personal links with major internet service providers like MTN, Airtel, Glo NG and Star links or through commercial browsing centres located in the town squares.

== Government ==
Gadaka town is the location of the court of Mai Gudi, His Royal Highness Alhaji Ismaila Ahmad Dala Ibn Madubu Khaji II, the first-class emir of Gudi and chairman of the Gudi Emirate council.

=== Gudi Emirate Council Title Holders ===
members of the Emirate council include the Waziri of Gudi, Alhaji Hussaini Adamu Masaya, the wakilin Gudi, Alhaji Usman Hassan Gadaka, the Kaigaman Gudi Dr Ibrahim Garba Kurmi, Sarkin Fada Gudi Alhaji Ibrahim Babi, the Magaji of Gudi Alhaji Muhammadu Baba, the Madaki of Gudi Alhaji Mohammed Gadaka, the Galadima of Gudi AVM Bashir Yakasai, Dan Masanin of Gudi Mal. Abdullahi Gadaka, Prof. Madu Adamu Gadaka the Turakin of Gudi, Amina Muhammad Jalo Dawisu of Gudi, Mallam Emmanuel Bazam Martarab of Gudi, Dauda Alhaji Baba Magaji Gudi, Sadauki of Gudi, The Tafidan of Gudi Alhaji Dahiru Mohammed Mailafiya, The Ubandoman of Gudi Alhaji Ussaini Dauya, The Tida of Gudi Abdullahi Baba Adamu, The Magajin Rafin of Gudi Hassan Madaki, The Yariman of Janga Ibrahim Mohammed, The Galidaman of Gudi Dr.Bashir Yakasai, The Dan lelen of Gudi Alhaji Shitu Adamu Nasara, Mujaddadin of Gudi Shuaibu A. Isa, The Dallatu of Gudi Umar Adamu Bappa. The administrative hierarchy in Gadaka town starts from the Bulama (ward head) to Lamba (town or village head) and then to the Ajiya (district head. All these are custodians of the people's culture and beliefs, and as such answerable to his Highness, the Mai Gudi.

== Language and culture ==
Ngamo is the native language of Gadaka, classified as one of the Chadic languages of the Afro-Asiatic language family. Alternative names for Ngamo include Gamawa, Gamo, and Ngamawa. Other languages in the area are Bolewa, Karai-Karai, Ngizim, Kanuri, Hausa, and Fulani.

The native Ngamo language has two major dialects, viz, Gudi Ngamo and Yaya Ngamo. These dialects are spoken by the various clans both within and outside Gadaka. The dialects have suffered incessant incrustation by neighbouring languages especially the Bole, Karai-Karai, and Hausa, and sometimes English, which is used by a majority of the youths during communication. All the major Ngamo clans are found now in Gadaka town, which include the Gudi clan (largest), the kushi clan (rulers of the central Gadaka area), the Shula (mainly warriors and hunters), the Ziu clan, the Mele clan, the Shembire clan (The Barbers), the Bopali, etc.

The people of Gadaka have a very rich cultural heritage. The most important annual cultural occasion is the Eid al-Kabir festival which has now replaced the famous Kamti festival. But still activities such as the wasan makara (for blacksmiths), wasan Wanzamai (for barbers), wasan Farauta (for hunters) and the traditional wrestling competition of the old Kamti festival are still adopted in today's Eid festivals. Gadaka is surrounded by smaller villages such as Fika, (9 km, 6 mi distant), Garin Malam Yako (6 km, 4 mi), Dadin Kowa (8 km, 5 mi), Babaji - (2 km, 1 mi), Dadin Kowa Semo - (13 km, 8 mi), Babanana - (11 km, 7 mi), Garin Aba - (12 km, 7 mi), Jajiyaya - (9 km, 6 mi), Ga dana - (6 km, 4 mi), Balde - (12 km, 7 mi), Japde - (11 km, 7 mi), Dawarko - (6 km, 4 mi), Usaku - (8 km, 5 mi), Bozoganga - (5 km, 3 mi), Shembire - (7 km, 4 mi), Garin Jangam - (4 km, 2 mi), Daniski - (10 km, 6 mi), Pokkitok - (11 km, 7 mi), Tamana - (11 km, 7 mi), Garin Meri - (4 km, 2 mi), Shembire - (2 km, 1 mi), Yawale - (3 km, 2 mi), Garin Aba - (11 km, 7 mi), Kukawa - (8 km, 5 mi), Lamba Disa - (3 km, 2 mi), Bogargar - (5 km, 3 mi), Maiduwa - (10 km, 6 mi), Sayo - (3 km, 2 mi), Goge -(5 km, 3 mi), Garin Gamji-(4 km, 2 mi) Jajiyaya (4 km, 2 mi), Kuli, Zadawa, (7 km, 4 mi). Others are Gashinge, Lampo, G.Dauya, G. Waziri Kadi, Gamari, Daniski, Kurmi, Fusami, Siminti, Gadana, Jigawa, Godowoli etc.

== Demographics and society ==
The available population statistics on Gadaka indicate a population density of 165 people per square mile. Malnutrition indices suggest 3.0% of children below 5 years old are underweight. Infant mortality stands at 101 per 1000 births. Life expectancy at birth is 52.76 years for males and 54.41 years for females (2011 estimates). Night light intensity is almost 15%.

Gadaka people are social and hospitable accommodating students, traders, foreign investors, mechanized farmers and tourists.
