= KKS =

KKS could refer to:

- Giiwo language (ISO 639-3 code), an Afro-Asiatic language spoken in Nigeria
- Kankesanthurai, Sri Lanka
- Karin Keller-Sutter, President of the Swiss Confederation since 1 January 2025
- Kinin–kallikrein system, a hormonal system
- Kirk Sandall railway station, England
- KKS 1925 Kalisz, a football club in Poland
- Kool Savas, a rap musician from Germany
- Kristiania Kommunale Sporveie, a defunct tram operator in Oslo, Norway
- Kuala Kangsar, a toll plaza on the North–South Expressway in Malaysia
- Kvindelige Kunstneres Samfund, Danish Society of Female Artists
- Lech Poznań, a football club in Poland
  - KKS Wiara Lecha, a football club founded by its fans
- The Kirillov-Kostant-Souriau symplectic form of symplectic geometry, see Coadjoint representation.
