= KSQ =

KSQ or ksq may refer to:

- KSQ, the IATA code for Karshi Airport, Uzbekistan
- ksq, the ISO 639-3 code for Kwaami language, Nigeria
