= Geruma =

Geruma may be,

- Geruma Island, Japan
- Geruma language, Nigeria
