= Kubi =

Kubi may refer to:

== People ==
- John Kubi, a 1992 Winnipeg municipal election nominee
- Kwabena Appiah-Kubi, a New Zealand professional footballer who plays as a winger
- Kubi Indi, a Zimbabwean development activist and businesswoman

== Others ==
- Kubi language
- Kubi (film), a Japanese film by Takeshi Kitano
