= Karekare =

Karekare could refer to:

- Karekare, New Zealand, a coastal settlement nestled in Auckland's Waitākere Ranges
- Karekare language, a language of Nigeria
- Kare-kare, a Filipino oxtail stew with thick peanut sauce
