= Bubure language =

Bubure may be:

- Vute language
- Bure language
