= Ismaila Ahmed Gadaka =

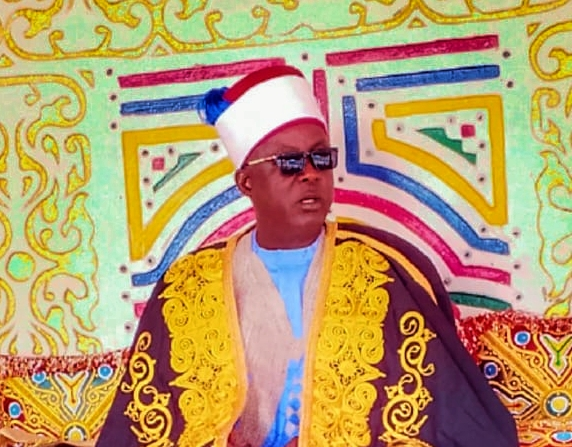

Emir of Gudi
- 1st reign: 2 August 2025 – present
- Coronation: 2 August 2025
- Predecessor: Isa Bunuwo Ibn Madugu Khaji II
- Born: Gadaka, Northern Region, Nigeria
Names
- Ismaila Ahmed Dala Ibn Madubu Khaji
- Religion: Islam

Alhaji Ismaila Ahmed Dala Ibn Madugu Khaji II was appointed 20th Emir, or traditional ruler, of the Gudi Emirate on 2nd August 2025. The emir's palace is in Gadaka, Yobe State, Nigeria. The Emir (or Mai in the local language) is head of the Ngamo people.

== Early career ==
Ismaila Gadaka started his career in the banking sector and was employed by United Bank for Africa (UBA) and then crossed over to the Standard Trust Bank where he rose to become the Business Manager. From 2007 to 2010, he served as the Hon. Commissioner in the Yobe state government. In the 2011 elections, he served as a member of the Nigeria Federal House of Representatives representing Fika/Fune Federal constituency in Yobe State. He is the Chairman of the Local Government Project Monitoring and Evaluation Committee from 2024 to date. He is also the Chairman of the Governing Council, Federal College of Education, Yawuri, Kebbi state, from 2024 to date.

== Emir ==
Before he was appointed emir, Ismaila Gadaka held the title of Yariman Gudi. He became emir in succession to Alhaji Isa Bunuwo Madugu Ibn Khaji in August 2025 after the Governor of Yobe State, Mai Mala Buni, selected his name from a list of candidates presented by the Gudi Emirate kingmakers.

== Ancestry ==
Gudi Emirate Council, Yobe State – Past & Present Emirs
S/N	Names	From	To	Years
1	Mai Gudi	1801	1821	20
2	Mai Gali	1821	1842	21
3	Mai Janga	1842	1846	4
4	Mai Malka I	1846	1849	3
5	Mai Malka II	1849	1853	4
6	Mai Mado	1853	1859	6
7	Mai Galka	1859	1862	3
8	Mai Khahji	1862	1866	4
9	Mai Guze	1866	1870	4
10	Mai Loda	1870	1871	1
11	Mai Ambe	1871	1881	10
12	Mai Bebe Tunga	1881	1886	5
13	Mai Waya	1886	1890	4
14	Mai Somlo	1891	1897	6
15	Mai Doya	1897	1899	2
16	Mai Gado	1899	1902	3
17	Mai Bunuwo	1902	1910	8
18	Mai Yanka	1910	1931	21
19	Mai Isa Ibn Khaji Bunowo	1993	2025	32
20	Mai Isma'ila Ahmed Ibn Madugu Khaji II	2025	present	—
