= Kulung language (West Chadic) =

West Chadic language

Kulung
- Wurkum
- Native to: Nigeria
- Region: Karim Lamido LGA, Taraba State
- Native speakers: 2,000 (2019)
- Language family: Afro-Asiatic: Chadic; West Chadic; Bole–Angas; Bole–Tangale (A.2); Tangale (South); Kulung

Language codes
- ISO 639-3: –

Kulung (Wurkum) is a minor West Chadic language of Karim Lamido LGA, Taraba State, Nigeria that was recently reported by Roger Blench. The language is not reported in Ethnologue or Glottolog. Blench (2019) gives a rough estimate of about 2,000 speakers.

Kulung speakers consider themselves to be ethnically part of the larger Jarawan Bantu-speaking Kulung, although their language is West Chadic and related to Piya. The language exhibits considerable Jarawan influence but retains its Chadic character.
