= Russell Schuh =

American linguist (1941–2016)

- Born: Russell Galen Schuh; March 14, 1941; Corvallis, Oregon
- Died: November 8, 2016 (aged 75); Los Angeles, California
- Occupation: Linguist

Academic background
- Education: University of California, Los Angeles
- Thesis: Aspects of Ngizim Syntax (1972)
- Doctoral advisor: Paul Newman

Academic work
- Institutions: University of California, Los Angeles
- Main interests: Chadic languages

Russell Galen Schuh (March 14, 1941, in Corvallis, Oregon – November 8, 2016, in Los Angeles, California) was an American linguist known for his extensive work on Chadic languages, especially Hausa and West Chadic languages.

== Early life ==
Schuh was born on March 14, 1941, in Corvallis, Oregon. He spent his childhood in Klamath Falls, Oregon.

== Education ==
Schuh graduated with a B.A. degree in French from the University of Oregon in 1963, an M.A. degree in French from Northwestern University in 1964, and a Ph.D. degree in 1972 from the University of California, Los Angeles. For his doctoral dissertation, he studied under Paul Newman and did fieldwork on Ngizim at Potiskum, Yobe State.

From 1965 to 1967, he was a Peace Corps volunteer in Agadez, Niger, where he learned to speak Hausa and worked with a Tamazhaq disc jockey for Radio Niger. He also spent 1973-1975 doing fieldwork in Gashua, Nigeria.

== Career ==
Schuh was a leading scholar in Chadic languages.

From 1982 to 1983, he was a visiting professor at Ahmadu Bello University in Zaria, Kaduna State, Nigeria.

In 2015, he became Distinguished Professor at UCLA.

== Personal life ==
Schuh was an avid marathon runner.
