= Kode people =

Kode
Widala

Regions with significant populations
- Taraba State, Nigeria

Languages
- Maghdi (Adamawa) and Kholok (West Chadic)

The Kode people, who refer to themselves using the endonym Widala, are a multilingual ethnic group of Taraba State, Nigeira.

The Kode (Widala) people consist of two groups speaking two separate languages, each belonging to different language families. One group speaks Maghdi, an Adamawa language, while the other group speaks Kholok, a West Chadic language.

== Bibliography ==
- Ahmed, Manu (1992). Widala Culture and History.
