= Paul Newman (linguist) =

American linguist (born 1937)

- Born: 1937 (age 88–89); Jacksonville, Florida
- Known for: Hausa linguistics and lexicography

Academic background
- Education: University of Pennsylvania (B.A.), (M.A.), UCLA (Ph.D.)

Academic work
- Discipline: Linguistics
- Institutions: Yale University, Bayero University, University of Leiden, Indiana University
- Notable students: Russell Schuh

Paul Newman (born 1937) is an American linguist active in the study of African languages. He writes on the Hausa language of Nigeria and on the Chadic language family. He wrote the Modern Hausa–English Dictionary (1977), co-authored with his wife, Roxana Ma Newman, and The Hausa Language: An Encyclopedic Reference Grammar (2000). He is the founder of the Journal of African Languages and Linguistics, a journal in the field of African-language studies.

He has taught at Yale University, the University of Leiden, and the Centre for the Study of Nigerian Languages at Bayero University in Kano, Nigeria. He is currently Distinguished Professor in the Department of Linguistics at Indiana University after serving two terms as chairman of the department.

Newman is a strong advocate of the theories of his mentor, Joseph Greenberg, and has published a work in defense of Greenberg's classification of African languages entitled On Being Right.

Newman, a dedicated member of the Linguistic Society of America (LSA), is also interested in the relation of language and law and is a strong advocate of civil liberties; spending a number of years volunteering for the Society as Special Counsel, Newman worked dealing mostly in online publications with copyright issues. In addition to degrees in anthropology and linguistics he holds a JD (IU Bloomington, 2003) and is a member of the Indiana state bar.

== Selected works ==
- 1977. With Roxana Ma Newman. Modern Hausa-English Dictionary / Sabon Kamus Na Hausa Zuwa Turanci. Ibadan, Nigeria: Oxford University Press.
- 1980. The Classification of Chadic within Afroasiatic. Leiden: Universitaire Pers Leiden.
- 1990. Nominal and Verbal Plurality in Chadic. Dordrecht: Foris.
- 1995. On Being Right: Greenberg's African Linguistic Classification and the Methodological Principles Which Underlie It. Bloomington: Institute for the Study of Nigerian Languages and Cultures, African Studies Program, Indiana University.
- 2000. The Hausa Language: An Encyclopedic Reference Grammar. New Haven: Yale University Press.
- 2001. With Martha Ratliff (editors). Linguistic Fieldwork. Cambridge: Cambridge University Press.
- 2002. Chadic and Hausa Linguistics: Selected Papers of Paul Newman, with Commentaries, edited by Philip J. Jaggar and H. Ekkehard Wolff. Köln: Rudiger Köppe Verlag.
- 2004. Klingenheben's Law in Hausa. Köln: Rudiger Köppe Verlag.
- 2007. A Hausa–English Dictionary. New Haven: Yale University Press.
- 2022. A History of the Hausa Language. Reconstruction and Pathways to the Present. Cambridge: Cambridge University Press.
