= Gwandara language =

West Chadic language

Gwandara
- Kwandara
- Native to: Nigeria
- Native speakers: (27,000 cited 2000)
- Language family: Afro-Asiatic: Chadic; West; Hausa–Gwandare (A.1); Gwandara
- Dialects: Gwandara Karashi; Gwandara Koro; Gwandara Gitata; Kyan Kyar; Nimbia; Toni

Language codes
- ISO 639-3: gwn
- Glottolog: gwan1268
- Linguasphere: 18-HAA-a

Gwandara is a West Chadic language, and the closest relative of Hausa. Its several dialects are spoken in northern Nigeria, predominantly in the north central region of Nigeria by the Gwandara people and some settlers who are about 30,000 people. They are found in large numbers in Abuja, Niger, Kaduna, Kogi and a resettlement town of New Karshi, Karu LGA, Nasarawa State. New Karshi has a Gwandara first class emir Muhammadu Bako III (PhD).

The Gwandara people are one of the indigenous tribes of FCT Abuja, the capital city of Nigeria.

The Nimbia dialect has a duodecimal numeral system (they count in base 12), whereas other dialects, such as Karshi below, have decimal systems:

	Nimbia	Karshi
1	da	da
2	bi	bi
3	ugu	uku
4	furu	huru
5	biyar	biyari
6	shide	shida
7	bo'o	bakwe
8	tager	takushi
9	tanran	tara
ten	gwom	gom
eleven	kwada	gom sha da
twelve	tuni	gom sha bi

It is thought that Nimbia, which is isolated from the rest of Gwandara, acquired its duodecimal system from neighboring East Kainji languages. It is duodecimal even to powers of base twelve: The Nimbia 12 number set number system is known for making division easier.

tuni mbe da	13	(dozen and one)
gume bi	24	(two dozen)
gume bi ni da	25	(two dozen and one)
gume kwada ni kwada	143	(eleven dozen and eleven)
wo	144	(gross)
wo bi	288	(two gross)
