= Hassan Jonga =

Nigerian politician

Hassan Jonga was an elected member of the House of Representatives for the Nangere/Potiskum Federal Constituency of Yobe State, Nigeria. He assumed office in May 1999 in the 4th national assembly. He was succeeded by Fatima Talba. He was a member of the All Nigeria Peoples Party (ANPP).
