= Poki language =

West Chadic language of Nigeria

Poki
- Native to: Nigeria
- Region: Bauchi State
- Language family: Afro-Asiatic: Chadic?; West Chadic?; (unclassified); Poki

Language codes
- ISO 639-3: None (mis)
- Linguist List: 10a
- Glottolog: None

Poki is an unclassified, purportedly West Chadic language of Bauchi State, Nigeria mentioned in Campbell & Hoskison (1972). However, not all "Chadic" languages mentioned in that report are actually Chadic.
