= Hausa–Gwandara languages =

Chadic language branch of West Africa

Hausa–Gwandara
- A.1 West Chadic
- Geographic distribution: Nigeria and Niger
- Linguistic classification: Afro-Asiatic: Chadic; West; Hausa–Gwandara

Language codes
- ISO 639-3: –
- Glottolog: west2718
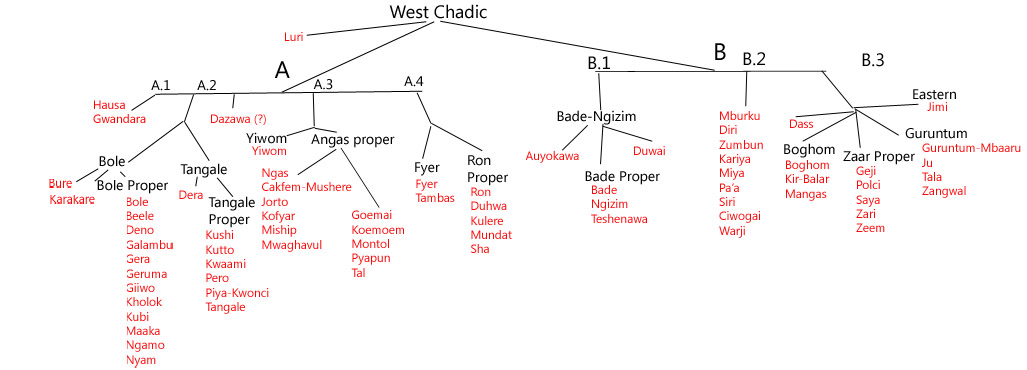
- West Chadic per Newman (1977)

The Hausa–Gwandara languages (also known as the A.1 West Chadic languages) of the Afro-Asiatic family are spoken principally in Niger and Nigeria. They include Gwandara and Hausa, the most populous Chadic language and a major language of West Africa.

== Languages ==
The two Hausa–Gwandara languages are:

- Hausa
- Gwandara

== Classification within West Chadic ==
Based on nominal morphology and other grammatical patterns, Blench (2021) considers the Hausa–Gwandara branch to have been the first West Chadic branch to have split off from Proto-West Chadic.

== Non-Chadic influences ==
The Hausa–Gwandara languages have many words that are not found in other Chadic languages because they are loans from Adamawa, Plateau, Kainji, Nupoid, and other Benue-Congo languages acquired during its expansion across the Nigerian Middle Belt. While those languages became assimilated, many of their words had changed the lexicon of Hausa. Some likely influence from vanished Nilo-Saharan languages on Hausa has been proposed.

List of Hausa words of likely Benue-Congo origin:

English	Hausa
nine	tárà
mother/woman	uwaa
to wash (body)	wankèè
bed	gado
red, bright red	jaa
year	shekara
porcupine	beguwa
agama lizard	ƙadangare
water	ruwaa
sun, day	rana
egg	ƙwǎy
lion	záákii
leopard	dààmísàà
month, moon	wátàà
hare	zóómóó
scorpion	kunāma
want/need/like/love/wish	soo
gourd (sphincter)	kondo, ƙunduu
doctor	bokaa
hunger	yúnwàà
shoe	tākalmi
spear grass	tofa
kind, sort	iri
dance	ráwáá
stream	rafi
ram	rago
baboon	goggo, gwaggo
war	yāƙi
axe	gātari
good, right	dede, daidai
bulrush millet	maiwa
iburu	iburu
half	raabi
village/settlement	tungaa
female breast	mààmáá
flat rock	fā, pā
shelter	bukka
chew	tauna, tamna
meat	náamàa
oil	mai
pumpkin	kàbééwàà
