= Maghdi language =

Adamawa language spoken in Nigeria

Mághdì
- Native to: Nigeria
- Region: Taraba State
- Native speakers: (2,000 cited 1992)
- Language family: Niger–Congo?: Atlantic–Congo; Bambukic; Bikwin–Jen; Bikwin; Mághdì

Language codes
- ISO 639-3: gmd
- Glottolog: magh1238
- ELP: Mághdì

Mághdì
- Person: Mághdì
- People: lee Mághdì
- Language: Mághdì

Mághdì is an Adamawa language of Nigeria.

It is spoken by a group of the Kode people, who refer to themselves as the Widala. The other Kode (Widala) people speak Kholok, a West Chadic language.
