= Gooya Valley =

Valley in Nigeria

Goya Valley
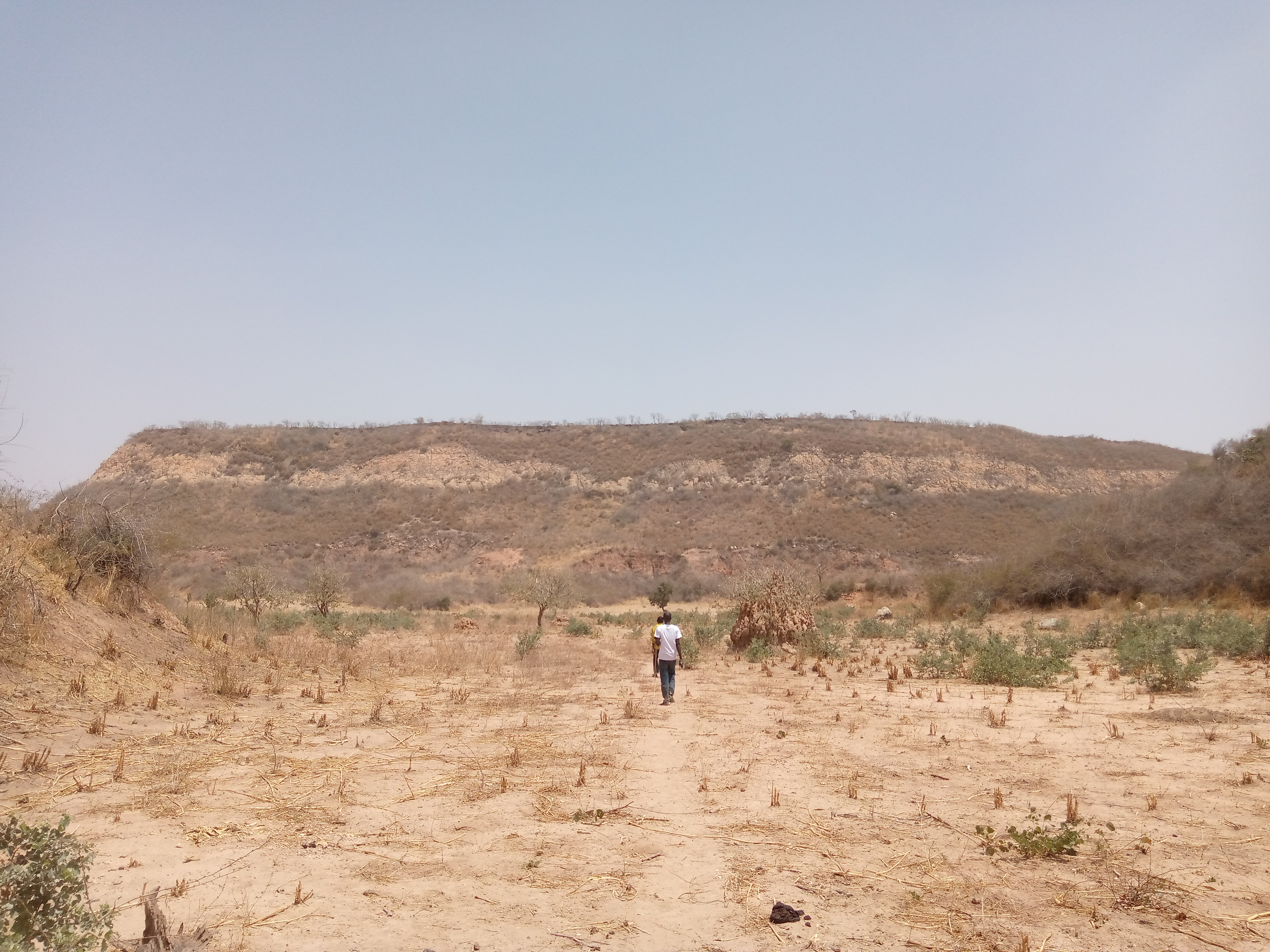

Naming
- English translation: a deep gorge
- Language of name: Karai-Karai

Geography
- Location: Yobe State, Nigeria

Gooya, Goya or Gòoya is an archaeological site, ancient city and a mountainous valley with many hollows, caves and gorges found in Fika local government area, Yobe State, Nigeria. It is considered one of the tourists attraction sites in Yobe and the deepest gorge valley in Nigeria. The site is presently a home for various wild animals like hyenas and monkeys. It was used for a defensive retreat by the Karai-karai people against invading neighbouring tribes during intertribal wars. Oral traditions state that it was the former territory of the Karai-karai people and remains of the former city walls and ruined homes are still visible.

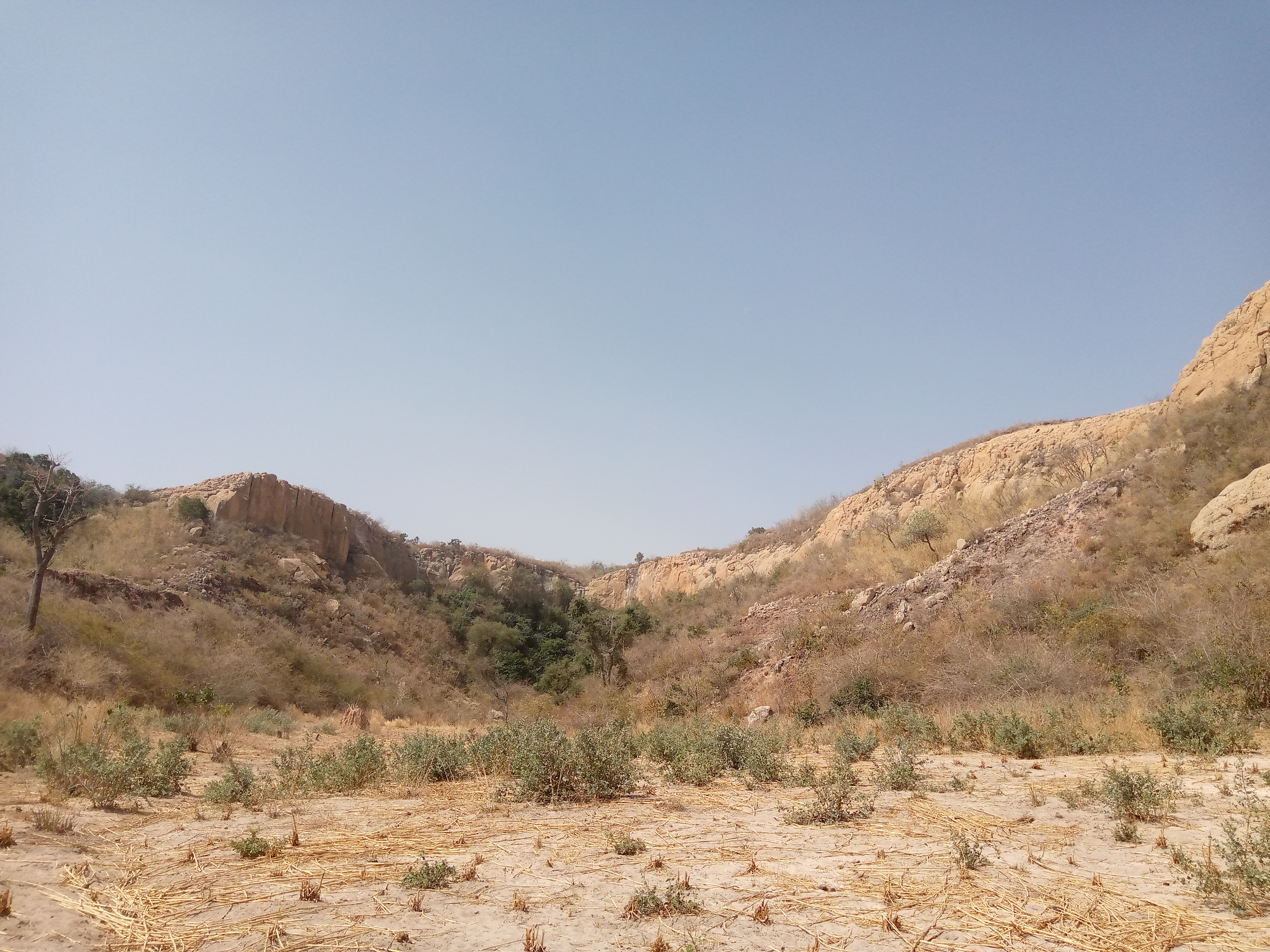
The rock in 2023

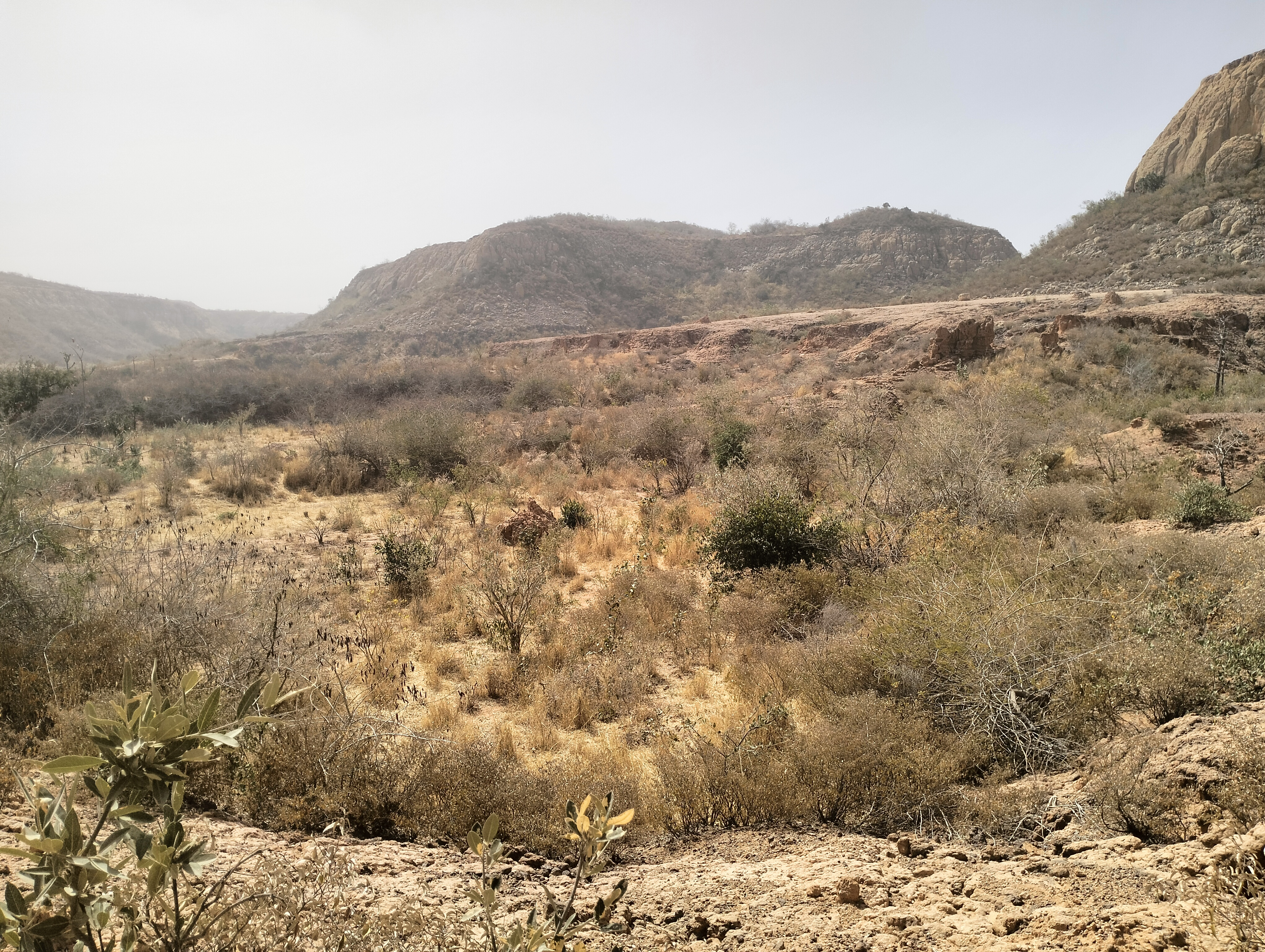
The rock in 2023

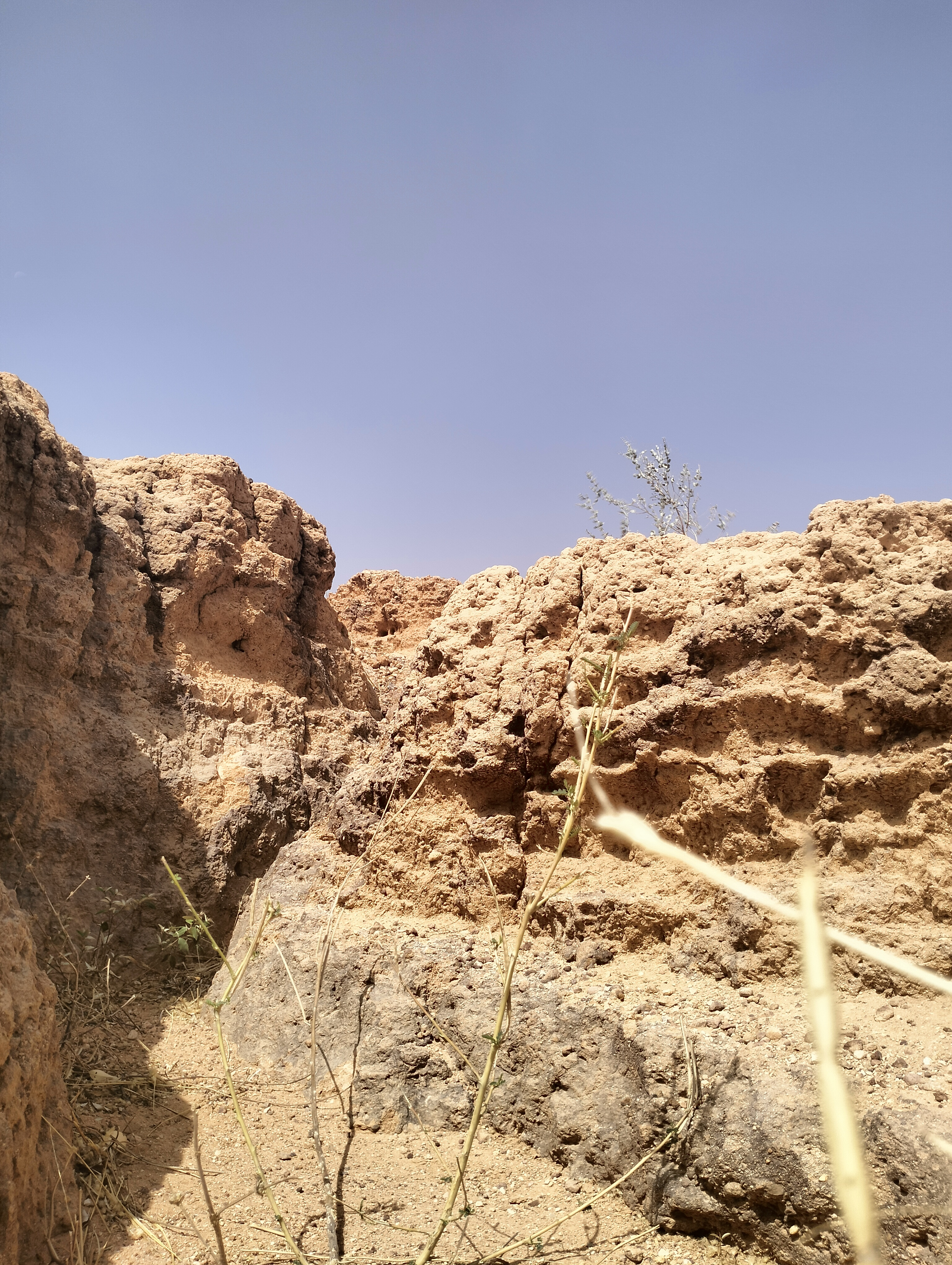
The rock in 2023

== History ==
Oral history has it that after the rule of Ayam, Dakau and many other rulers, news reached Mai Idris Alooma (1580 - 1617) about his kinsmen i.e. the Karai-karai people. As a result, the narration said, Alooma marched to the Karai-karai land of western Kanem Borno with the sole aim of taking all the Karai-karai people to a place near him. The news of his trip and intent reached the Karai-karai people. The people on the other hand decided to leave for Gooya (a deep gorge) which the Karai-karai people especially those who came via the Gongola basin discovered as the fortified place for retreat whenever they felt they had no enough time to alert the rest of their kin and kith elsewhere on the oncoming of any danger.

Mai Gireema was the leader who led the Karai-karai people to Gooya.

== See also ==
- Aso Rock
