= Aso Rock =

Monolith in Nigeria

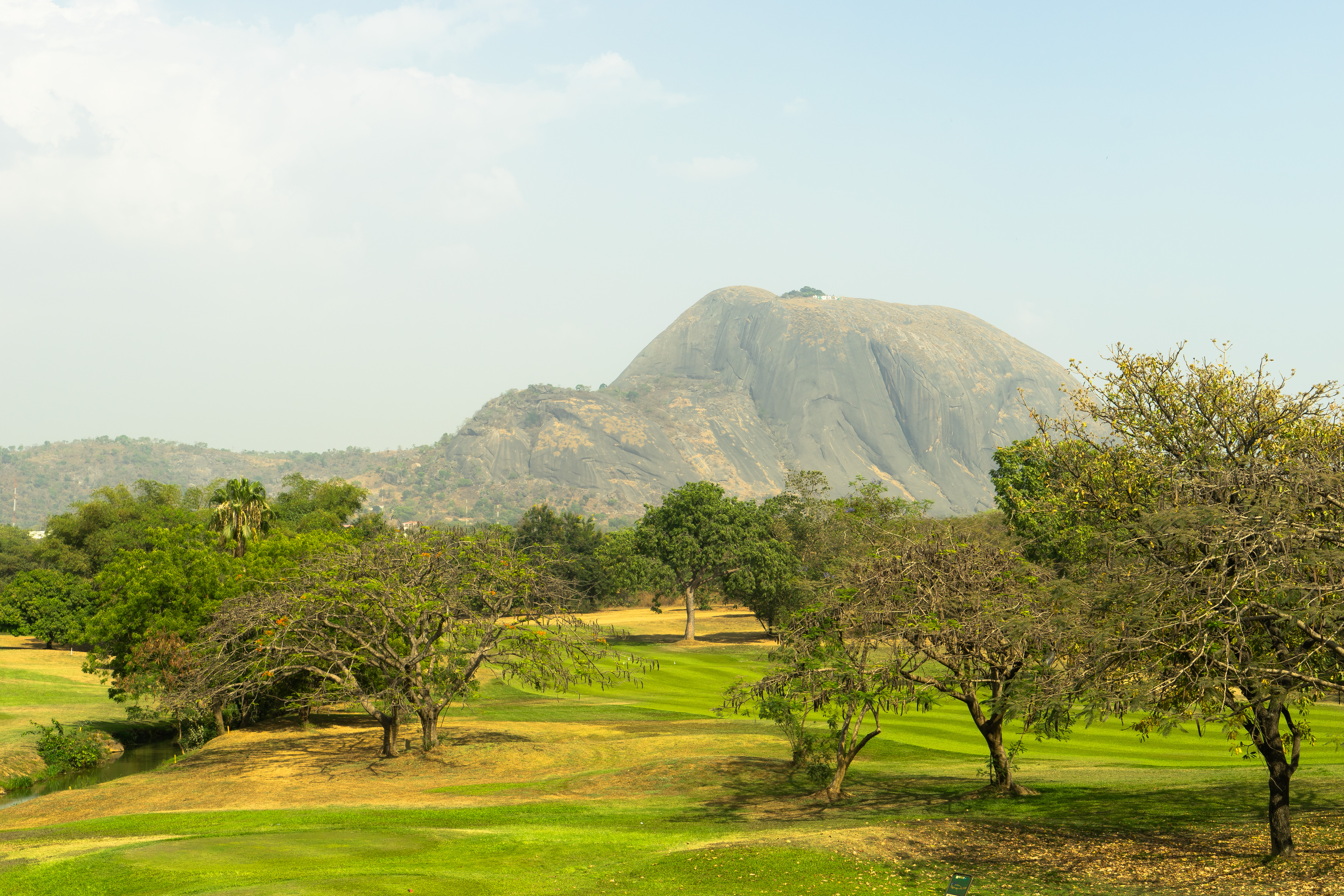

Highest point
- Elevation: 936 m (3,071 ft)
- Coordinates: 9°5′0″N 7°32′10″E

Geography
- Location within Nigeria
- Location: Nigeria

Aso Rock is a large outcrop of granitic rock located on the outskirts of Abuja, the capital of Nigeria. The Aso Rock is a monolith with a peak height of 936 metres (3,071 ft) above sea level, 400 metres (1,300 ft) above the surrounding land. It is one of the city's most noticeable features. The Nigerian Presidential Complex, Nigerian National Assembly, and Nigerian Supreme Court are located around it. Much of the city extends to the south of the rock. "Aso" means victorious in the native language of the Asokoro ("the people of victory") ethnic group.

Aso Rock was the site of the 2003 Aso Rock Declaration, issued by the Heads of Government of the Commonwealth of Nations during the CHOGM held in Abuja. It reaffirmed the Commonwealth's principles as detailed under the Harare Declaration but set the "promotion of democracy and development" as the organisation's priorities.

== History ==
The then President of Nigeria Ibrahim Babangida administration founded Aso Villa in 1991, the same year that Nigeria's capital was transferred from Lagos to Abuja, and it is situated on the outskirts of Abuja, Nigeria's capital.

== Aso Rock Villa Buildings ==
The Aso Rock Villa is surrounded by the Nigerian Presidential Complex, the Nigerian National Assembly, and the Nigerian Supreme Court. Most of the surrounding town is situated to the south of the iconic rocky outcropping. The villa was also the site of the Aso Rock Declaration, issued by Commonwealth Heads of Government during the 2003 Commonwealth Heads of Government Meeting (CHOGM) in Abuja.

Within the Aso Rock Villa complex, the chapel, café, and mosque are located to cater to the religious and social needs of its occupants. The presidential mansion itself contains multiple rooms for various official functions. It houses the offices of both the Nigerian President and Vice President, as well as dedicated meeting spaces for official engagements.

== See also ==
- Zuma Rock
- Gooya Valley
