= Miya language =

Chadic language of Nigeria

Miya
- Native to: Nigeria
- Region: Bauchi State
- Native speakers: (30,000 cited 1995)
- Language family: Afro-Asiatic: Chadic; West Chadic; Bade–Warji; Warji (B.2); Miya

Language codes
- ISO 639-3: mkf
- Glottolog: miya1266

Miya (Miyawa) is a Chadic language of the Afro-Asiatic language family spoken in Bauchi State, Nigeria. It is also referred to as "vә́na mίy" translating to "mouth of miy". There are approximately 5,000 speakers of Miya. It is related to languages such as Hausa, which the Miya people sometimes borrow from.

== Grammar ==
=== Verb morphology ===
Miya's verb morphology is suprasegmental, where the masculine first person is marked with a high tone.

=== Noun classes ===
Miya's noun class is divided between feminine and masculine, as well as a divider on morphology between animate and inanimate nouns. Noun classes where all nouns are under the class of feminine of masculine is called grammatical gender.
