= Pali language (Chadic) =

West Chadic language of Nigeria

Pali
- Native to: Nigeria
- Language family: Afro-Asiatic: Chadic; West Chadic; Bole–Angas; Bole–Tangale (A.2) (presumably); Bole ?; Pali

Language codes
- ISO 639-3: None (mis)
- Glottolog: None

Pali is a West Chadic language of Nigeria. It was reported by Rudolf Leger.
