= Diri language =

Afro-Asiatic language of Nigeria

Diri
- Native to: Nigeria
- Region: Bauchi State
- Native speakers: (7,200 cited 2000)
- Language family: Afro-Asiatic: Chadic; West Chadic; Bade–Warji; Warji (B.2); Diri

Language codes
- ISO 639-3: dwa
- Glottolog: diri1259

Diri (Diryawa) is an Afro-Asiatic language spoken in Bauchi State, Nigeria.
