= Ngamo language =

Afro-Asiatic language spoken in Nigeria

Ngamo
- Native to: Nigeria
- Region: Gombe State, Yobe State
- Native speakers: (60,000 cited 1993)
- Language family: Afro-Asiatic: Chadic; West Chadic; Bole–Angas; Bole–Tangale (A.2); Bole (North); Ngamo

Language codes
- ISO 639-3: nbh
- Glottolog: ngam1282
- ELP: Ngamo

Ngamo (also known as Ngamawa, Gamo, Gamawa) is an Afro-Asiatic language spoken in Nigeria. The native Ngamo language has two major dialects, viz, Gudi Ngamo and Yaya Ngamo. These dialects are spoken by the various clans both within and outside Gadaka.

Ngamo is a member of the West Branch of Chadic and is hence related to Hausa, the dominant language throughout northern Nigeria. Ngamo's closest linguistic relatives are, however, its neighbors, Karekare, Bole, and Maka.

The Ethnologue gives a figure for 60,000 as the number of Ngamo speakers, which seems not unreasonable. The pre-eminent traditional ruler of the Ngamo people is Mai Gudi, Alhaji Isa Bunuwo Khahaji, whose court is located in Gadaka, about 60 kilometers south of Potiskum.

There are two major dialects of Ngamo, the Gudi dialect and the Yaya dialect. The dialects are different enough from each other in phonology, morphology, and lexicon that they border on being separate languages, but there is fair mutual intelligibility, which justifies grouping them as dialects of one language. The origin of the name “Ngamo” is not known. This root is used both as an autonym and by linguistic neighbors.

People Ngoi Ngamo (m), An Ngamo (f) Ngamaye (pl)

== Research ==
Research on the language has been conducted by the Yobe Languages Research Project. This project has been supported by two awards from the US National Science Foundation. The first, “The Chadic Languages of Yobe State, Nigeria” (award #BCS-0111289, Russell G. Schuh, Principal Investigator), ran from 2001 to 2004. The second, “Lexicon, Linguistic Structure, and Verbal Arts in Chadic Languages of Northeastern Nigeria” (award #BCS-0553222, Russell G. Schuh, Principal Investigator), ran from 2006 to 2009. Directors of the project under both grants are Russell G. Schuh, the Principal Investigator, and Alhaji Maina Gimba, the In-Country Director. From 2002 to 2004, members of the Ngamo team were Umaru Mamu Goge, Jibir Audu Janga Dole (both speakers of Gudi Ngamo), and Isa Adamu Gashinge (a speaker of Yaya Ngamo). Because of limitations of time and resources, it was decided for 2006–2009 to focus Ngamo research on the Gudi dialect, though some new data on Yaya Ngamo was collected in 2009, and more than half of the material in the 2009 collection of Ngamo verbal arts is in Yaya Ngamo. The members of the Ngamo team are Umaru Mamu Goge and Jibir Audu Janga Dole for Gudi, with Isa Adamu Gashinge providing Yaya data. Thanks go also to HRH Alhaji Isa Bunuwo, Mai Gudi for his support and to Madu Liman and his family for indispensable logistic support.
