= Goji language =

Western Chadic language of Nigeria

Goji
- Kushi, Chong'e
- Fo Goji
- Native to: Nigeria
- Region: Bauchi State
- Native speakers: (11,000 cited 1995)
- Language family: Afro-Asiatic: Chadic; West Chadic; Bole–Angas; Bole–Tangale (A.2); Tangale (South); Goji

Language codes
- ISO 639-3: kuh
- Glottolog: kush1236

Goji
- Person: Nya Goji
- People: Memme Goji
- Language: Fo Goji

Goji, also Kushi or Chong'e, is a West Chadic language of Nigeria.
