= Nyam language =

Afro-Asiatic Language

Nyam
- Native to: Nigeria
- Region: Taraba State
- Native speakers: 1,500 (2006)
- Language family: Afro-Asiatic: Chadic; West Chadic; Bole–Angas; Bole–Tangale (A.2); Tangale (South); Nyam

Language codes
- ISO 639-3: nmi
- Glottolog: nyam1285

Nyam (also known as Nyambolo) is an Afro-Asiatic language spoken in Ndallang, Andamin and other villages in Karim Lamido Local Government Area of Taraba State, Nigeria. Nyam are the holders of Nyam Chiefdom for over century. The Chiefdom is situated in Ndallang and the Chiefdom is ruling over villages like Andamin, Maltumbi, Wadata, Ndela, Wagal etc Nigeria.
