= Kanakuru language =

Chadic language spoken in Nigeria

Dera
- Kanakuru
- Native to: Nigeria
- Region: Adamawa State, Borno State
- Native speakers: (20,000 cited 1973)
- Language family: Afro-Asiatic: Chadic; West Chadic; Bole–Angas; Bole–Tangale (A.2); Tangale (South); Dera

Language codes
- ISO 639-3: kna
- Glottolog: dera1248

Dera
- Person: na Dera
- People: Dera
- Language: Bo Dera

Dera, or Kanakuru, is a West Chadic language of Nigeria.
