= Bure language =

Afro-Asiatic language spoken in Nigeria

Bure
- Bubbure
- Native to: Nigeria
- Region: Bauchi State
- Ethnicity: 500 (no date)
- Native speakers: 20 (2011)
- Language family: Afro-Asiatic: Chadic; West Chadic; Bole–Angas; Bole–Tangale (A.2); Bole (North); Bure

Language codes
- ISO 639-3: bvh
- Glottolog: bure1242
- ELP: Bure
- Location within Nigeria
- Coordinates: 10.523266°N 10.327586°E

Bure, also known as Bubbure (transl. mouth of Bure), is an Afro-Asiatic language belonging to the Bole-Tangale group of the West branch of the Chadic family. It is spoken in northern Nigeria in the village of Bure, Kirfi Local Government, Bauchi State, Nigeria and in some small settlements nearby. The language is used mostly by a very few speakers, and it is expected to become extinct in the next two decades. Except for Hausa, which is lingua franca in the area, Bure is surrounded by other Chadic languages such as Gera, Giiwo and Deno (Bole group).

== Status ==
Compared to other languages of the same language family (e.g. Bole or Karai-karai), the endangerment of Bure is by far the most critical. Bure is rarely used in daily contexts, even by fluent speakers of an elder generation. Linguist Gian Claudio Batic of the University of Naples classified the language as moribund, despite a handful of native speakers still being alive. He estimates the language will become extict within the next 20 years.

Within the 500 person population of the Bure village, only about 5% (about 20 individuals) can be expected to speak the Bure language. Batic blames Bure's declining status on Islamization of the village, rising use of Hausa, the lack of Bure orthography, and the lack of official language status in Nigeria.

Bure people often identify as Hausa and call themselves burawa, the Hausa word for the Bure people.

== Phonology ==
=== Consonants ===
		Labial	Alveolar	Palatal	Velar	Labiovelar	Glottal
Nasal		m	n	ɲ	ŋ		
Stop	voiceless	p	t	c	k	kʷ	ʔ
Stop	voiced	b	d	ɟ	ɡ	gʷ	ʔ
Fricative			s				
Trill			r				
Approximant				y		w	
Lateral			l				

Consonants can undergo place assimilation, where they take the place of the following consonant. For instance, òf 'open' in the perfective singular becomes ók‑kò 'opens', as opposed to the incorrect *óf‑kò.

=== Vowels ===
All Bure vowels can be contrastively long or short.

	Front	Mid	Back
High	i		u
Mid	e	ə	o
Low		a	

=== Tone ===
Bure has two tones: high (H) and low (L). The word sàrá 'arm' has a low tone on the first syllable and a high tone on the second.

== Syntax ==
=== Word classes ===
Bure word classes include nouns, adjectives, and verbs. The class of adjectives is relatively small, and to achieve an adjectival function, Bure speakers will commonly use periphrastic methods like word concatenation ('man' + 'height' = 'tall man') or ownership (‘owner of’ + noun).

Bure nouns have masculine or feminine gender. However, due to a process of partial gender deletion, many Bure speakers consider a large class of nouns as having either gender in free variation. Bure nouns can also be marked for plural or singular. For plural derivation, nouns can undergo some combination of suffixation and/or gemination of the second consonant.

=== Pronouns ===
As is common among Chadic languages, the pronouns exhibit a gender distinction only for the second and third person singular. In the plural, there is no gender marking.

=== Word order ===
Bure is a subject-verb-object language. However, pronominal objects are realized as an infix on the verb, rather than an independent word.

=== Verb tenses ===
For the perfective aspect, the suffix kò (with a possible allomorph of yò) is used. Consonant-final verbs in the singular perfective often undergo consonant place assimilation, resulting in geminate sequences. For instance, òf 'open' in the perfective singular becomes ók‑kò, as opposed to the incorrect *‘óf‑kò. For the plural context, the epenthetic vowel í is placed between the verb stem and the perfective marker and prevents any place assimilation.

For the perfective singular, the verb root always carries a high tone. However, in the perfective plural, the verb root can be high or low, so its underlying tone can be determined.

Meaning	Perfective (sg)	Perfective (pl)	Tone of verb root
follow	nák‑kò	nàf‑ínko	L
slaughter	sék‑kò	sèk‑íyò	L
enter	rí‑íyò	rí’‑íkò	H

== Numbers ==
Bure uses a base-10 counting system. Due to the language's endangered status, speakers may use Hausa numerals for large quantities. Nigerian linguist and academic Andrew Haruna collected the data in the table below.

Bure numbers 1-10
Number	Bure	Notes
1	móɗé	
2	máló	
3	kúnú	
4	ʄóɗó	
5	báɗé	
6	básúmé	
7	básùmáló	From 5 + 2
8	ʄórʄóɗó	From 2 x 4
9	ɓárdzìmóɗé	From 10 - 1
10	bárbáɗè	
