= Kutto language =

West Chadic language of Nigeria

Kúttò
- Kupto
- Native to: Nigeria
- Region: Bauchi State
- Native speakers: (3,000 cited 1995)
- Language family: Afro-Asiatic: Chadic; West Chadic; Bole–Angas; Bole–Tangale (A.2); Tangale (South); Kúttò

Language codes
- ISO 639-3: kpa
- Glottolog: kutt1236
- ELP: Kupto

Kúttò (Kupto) is a minor West Chadic language of Nigeria.
