= Bole–Tangale languages =

West Chadic language

Bole–Tangale
- A.2 West Chadic
- Geographic distribution: Bauchi, Yobe, Taraba, Gombe, Borno states of Nigeria
- Linguistic classification: Afro-Asiatic: Chadic; West Chadic; Bole–Tangale

Language codes
- Glottolog: west2715
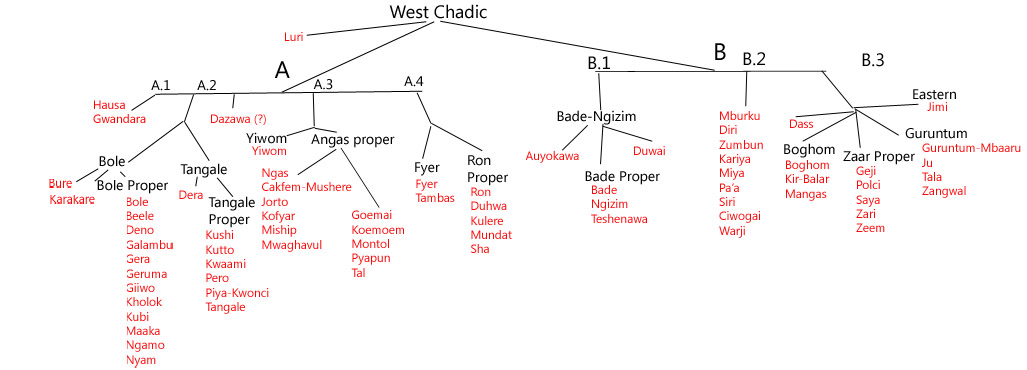
- West Chadic per Newman (1977)

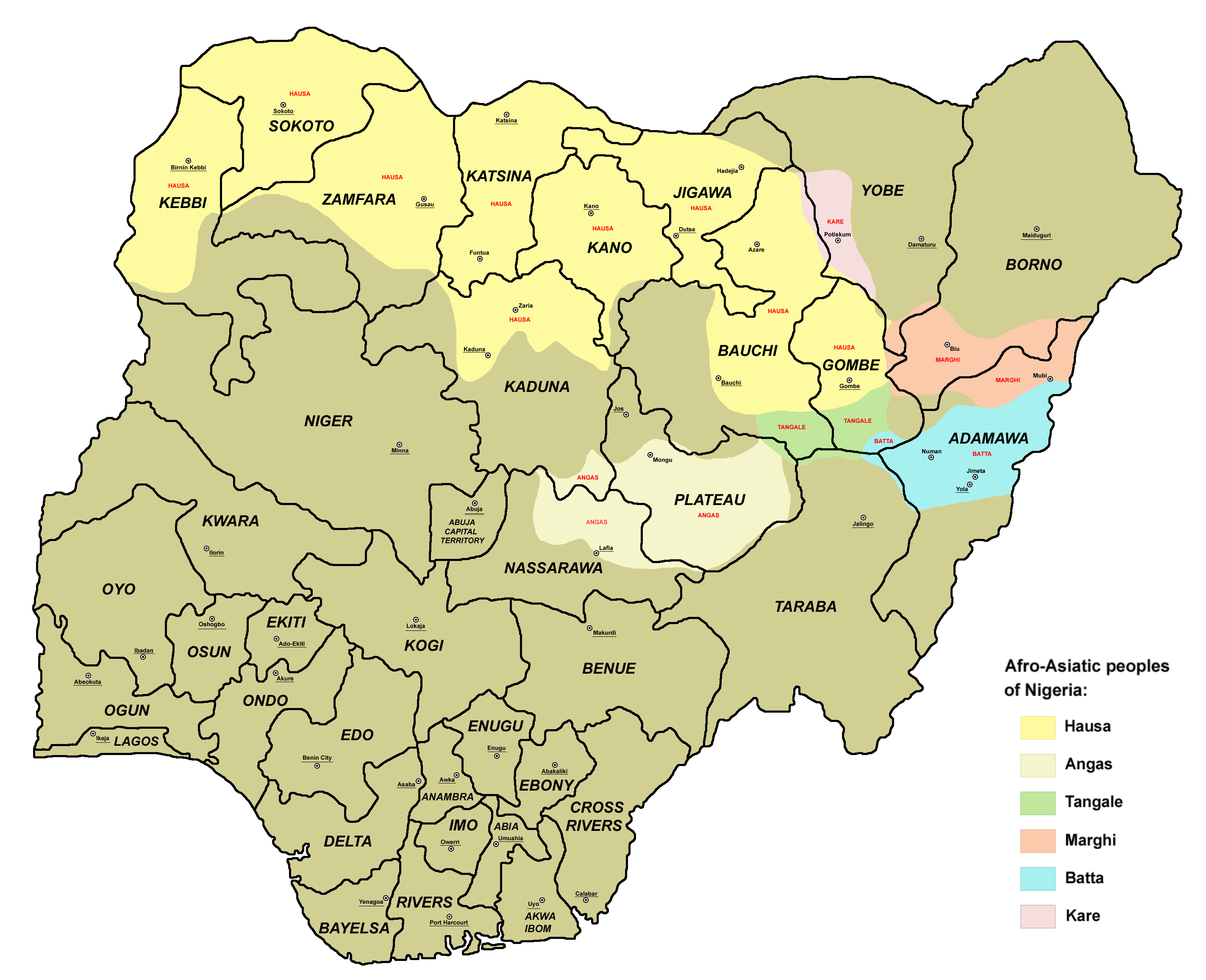
Main Chadic-speaking peoples in Nigeria

The Bole–Tangale languages (also known as the A.2 West Chadic languages) are a branch of West Chadic languages that are spoken in various states of northeastern Nigeria.

== Languages ==
The Bole–Tangale languages are:

- Bole (Bole–Tangale) (A.2)
  - North (Bole proper): Bure, Bole, Gera, Geruma, Deno, Galambu, Giiwo, Kubi, Ngamo, Maaka (Maagha), Ɓeele, Daza (Dazawa), ?Pali, Karekare
  - South (Tangale): Kwaami, Pero, Piya-Kwonci, Kulung, Kholok, Nyam, Kushi (Goji), Kutto (Kupto), Tangale, Dera (Kanakuru)

Karekare is the most divergent language within the Bole branch, while Dera is the most divergent language within the Tangale branch.

== Names and locations ==
Below is a comprehensive list of Bole–Tangale language names, populations, and locations from Blench (2019).

Language	Cluster	Dialects	Alternate spellings	Own name for language	Endonym(s)	Other names (location-based)	Other names for language	Exonym(s)	Speakers	Location(s)
Daza			Daza						a few villages (Note: No data available)	Bauchi State, Darazo LGA
Bole		Bara, Fika (Fiyankayen, Anpika)		Bòò Pìkkà, Bopika	Am Pìkkà, Ampika	Fika, Piika	Bolanci	Anika, Bolewa	32,000 (1952 W&B); est. >100,000 (1990)	Bauchi State, Dukku, Alkaleri, and Darazo LGAs; Borno State, Fika LGA
Bure				BuBure	Bure		Bure		A single village southeast of Darazo town	Bauchi State, Darazo LGA
Ɓeele			Bele	Àɓéelé	bòhé áɓéelé sg., Àɓéelé pl.		Bellawa		120 (Temple 1922); a few villages	Bauchi State
Deno									9,900 (LA 1971)	Bauchi State, Darazo LGA; 45 km northeast of Bauchi town
Galambu			Galembi, Galambe	Galambu	Galambu				8505 (Temple 1922); 2020 (Meek 1925); 1000 (SIL)	Bauchi State, Bauchi LGA, at least 15 villages
Dera		Shani, Shellen and Gasi		Bo Dera	na Dera sg., Dera pl.	Kanakuru			11,300 (W&B)	Adamawa State, Shellen LGA; Borno State, Shani LGA
Fyandigeri				Fyandigere	sg. laa Fyandigeri, pl. Fyandigeri			Gerawa, Gere, Gera	13,300 (LA 1971); at least 30 villages. Many Gera villages no longer speak the language. A 2018 survey suggested there are only 4 villages where the language is being passed on to children.	Bauchi State, Bauchi and Darazo LGAs
Geruma		Sum, Duurum, possibly Gamsawa/Gamshi (Temple)	Gerema, Germa	Geerum (Duurum dialect); Gyeermu (Sum dialect)	Geerum (Duurum dialect); sg. na Gyeermu, pl. Gyeermu (Sum dial.)				4,700 (LA 1971)	Bauchi State, Toro and Darazo LGAs. At least 10 villages
Giiwo			Kirifi	Bu Giiwo	sg. Ba Giiwo, pl. Ma Giiwo				3,620 (1922 Temple); 14,000 (SIL)	Bauchi State, Alkaleri, Bauchi and Darazo LGAs, 24 villages
Karekare		Western Jalalum, northern Pakaro and eastern Ngwajum	Kәrekәre, Kerekere, Karaikarai, Kerikeri						39,000 (1952 W&B)	Bauchi State, Gamawa and Misau LGAs; Yobe State, Fika LGA
Kholok						Kode, Koode, Kwoode, Widala, Pia, Wurkum, Pitiko			2,500 (1977 Voegelin & Voegelin)	Taraba State, Karim Lamido LGA, near Didango
Kubi			Kuba						1,090 (1922 Temple); 500 (1973 SIL)	Bauchi State, Darazo LGA, 40 km. N.E. of Bauchi town
Kulung (Chadic)				Kulung (speakers consider themselves Kulung i.e. Jarawan Bantu, although their language is Chadic and related to Piya)		Wurkum			2000?	Taraba State, Karim Lamido LGA
Kutto			Kupto	Kúttò	Kúttò				Two villages. 3000 (1990 est.)	Bauchi State, Bajoga LGA, Yobe State, Gujba LGA
Maaka		Two dialects; Maaka (at Gulani) and Maha (at Vara)	Magha, Maga, Maha						More than 4,000 (1990)	Yobe State, Gujba LGA. Gulani and Bara towns and associated hamlets. Northeast of Dadin Kowa Reservoir.
Ngamo			Gamo						17,800 (1952 W&B)	Borno State, Fika LGA; Bauchi State, Darazo LGA, Darazo district and Dukku LGA, Nafada district
Pero		Dialects associated with three major settlements	Walo	Péerò	sg. Péerò, pl. Pìpéerò	Filiya [town name]			6,664 (1925 Meek); 20,000 (1973 SIL)	Gombe State, Shongom LGA, around Filiya. 3 main villages: Gwandum, Gundale and Filiya.
Piya–Kwonci cluster	Piya–Kwonci		Pia			Wurkum, Pitiko			2,500 (1977 Voegelin & Voegelin)	Taraba State, Karim Lamido LGA, near Didango
Piya	Piya–Kwonci		Pia			Wurkum				
Kwonci	Piya–Kwonci	Kunshenu							More than 4000 (1990)	
Goji				Fo Goji	Nya Goji pl. Memme Goji	Kushe, Kushi	Chong'e		4000 (1973 SIL); 5000 (1990). ca. 20 villages (2007)	Gombe State, Shongom LGA
Kwaami		Kafarati, Ɗolli	Kwami, Kwom	Kwáámì	Kwáámì	Komawa			10,000 (1990)	Bauchi State, Kwami LGA
Nyam					Nyambolo				A single village	Taraba State, Karim Lamido LGA, at Andami village
Tangale		Ture, Kaltungo, Shongom, Billiri	Tangle	Táŋlɛ̀		Billiri			36,000 (1952 W&B); 100,000 (1973 SIL)	Gombe State, Kaltungo, Alkaleri and Akko LGAs
