= Pero language =

West Chadic language

Pero
- Péerò
- Native to: Nigeria
- Region: Gombe State
- Native speakers: (25,000 cited 1995)
- Language family: Afro-Asiatic: Chadic; West Chadic; Bole–Angas; Bole–Tangale (A.2); Tangale (South); Pero

Language codes
- ISO 639-3: pip
- Glottolog: pero1241

Péerò
- Person: Péerò
- People: Pìpéerò
- Language: Péerò

Pero is a West Chadic language of Nigeria.
