= Gera language =

Afro-Asiatic language of Nigeria

Gera
- Fyandigere
- Native to: Nigeria
- Region: Bauchi State
- Native speakers: (200,000 cited 1995)
- Language family: Afro-Asiatic: Chadic; West Chadic; Bole–Angas; Bole–Tangale (A.2); Bole (North); Gera

Language codes
- ISO 639-3: gew
- Glottolog: gera1246

Fyandigeri
- Person: laa Fyandigeri
- People: Fyandigeri
- Language: Fyandigere

Gera (also known as Gerawa or Fyandigeri) is an Afro-Asiatic language spoken in Nigeria. Speakers are shifting to Hausa. Speakers refer to themselves as Fyandigeri (singular: laa Fyandigeri, plural Fyandigeri).

There are at least 30 villages where the language is spoken. Many Gera villages no longer speak the language. A 2018 survey suggested there are only 4 villages where the language is being passed on to children.

== See also ==
- Jarawa language (Nigeria)
