= Ɓeele language =

Afro-Asiatic language spoken in Nigeria

Ɓeele
- Àɓéelé
- Native to: Nigeria
- Region: Bauchi State
- Native speakers: 120
- Language family: Afro-Asiatic: Chadic; West Chadic; Bole–Angas; Bole–Tangale (A.2); Bole (North); Ɓeele

Language codes
- ISO 639-3: bxq
- Glottolog: beel1236
- ELP: Bele

Àɓéelé
- Person: bòhé áɓéelé
- People: Àɓéelé
- Language: Àɓéelé

Ɓeele (also known as Bele, Àbéélé, Bellawa) is an endangered Afro-Asiatic language spoken in a few villages in Bauchi State, Nigeria.
