= Kwaami language =

West Chadic language

Kwaami
- Native to: Nigeria
- Native speakers: (10,000 cited 1990)
- Language family: Afro-Asiatic: Chadic; West Chadic; Bole–Angas; Bole–Tangale (A.2); Tangale (South); Kwaami

Language codes
- ISO 639-3: ksq
- Glottolog: kwaa1269

The Kwaami language, also known as Komawa, Kwam, Kwamanchi, Kwami, or Kwom, is a West Chadic language spoken in Bauchi State, Nigeria, near the city of Gombe.
