= Galambu language =

Afro-Asiatic language of Nigeria

Galambu
- Native to: Nigeria
- Region: Bauchi State
- Native speakers: Ethnic population: 25,000 (2006)
- Language family: Afro-Asiatic: Chadic; West Chadic; Bole–Angas; Bole–Tangale (A.2); Bole (North); Galambu

Language codes
- ISO 639-3: glo
- Glottolog: gala1264

Galambu (also known as Galambi, Galambe, Galembi) is an Afro-Asiatic language spoken in Nigeria. Most members of the ethnic group do not speak Galambu.
