= Kholok language =

Afro-Asiatic language spoken in Nigeria

Kulung
- Native to: Nigeria
- Region: Taraba State
- Native speakers: (2,500 cited 1977)
- Language family: Afro-Asiatic: Chadic; West Chadic; Bole–Angas; Bole–Tangale (A.2); Tangale (South); Kulung

Language codes
- ISO 639-3: ktc
- Glottolog: khol1240

Kulung (also known as Kode, Koode, Kwoode, Pia, Pitiko, Widala, Wurkum) is an Afro-Asiatic language spoken in Nigeria.

It is spoken by a group of the Kode people, who refer to themselves as the Widala. The other Kode (Widala) people speak Maghdi, an Adamawa language.
