= Dazawa language =

Chadic language of Nigeria

Daza
- Dazawa
- Native to: Nigeria
- Region: Bauchi State
- Native speakers: 100 (2022)
- Language family: Afro-Asiatic: Chadic; West Chadic; Bole–Angas; Bole–Tangale (A.2); Bole (North); Daza

Language codes
- ISO 639-3: dzd
- Glottolog: daza1244

Daza or (in Hausa) Dazawa is listed by Blench (2006) as a Chadic language within the Bole group, spoken in a few villages of Darazo LGA, Bauchi State, Nigeria. It was confirmed to exist in 2021. The language is nearly extinct with only elderly speakers speaking the language. Native speakers have shifted to Hausa.
