= Deno language =

Afro-Asiatic language spoken in Nigeria

Deno
- Native to: Nigeria
- Region: Bauchi State
- Native speakers: (6,000 cited 1995)
- Language family: Afro-Asiatic: Chadic; West Chadic; Bole–Angas; Bole–Tangale (A.2); Bole (North); Deno

Language codes
- ISO 639-3: dbb
- Glottolog: deno1239

Deno (also known as Denawa, Denwa, Be) is an Afro-Asiatic language spoken in Nigeria. Speakers are shifting to Hausa and Fulfulde.
