= Piya language =

West Chadic language

Piya-Kwonci
- Ambandi
- Native to: Nigeria
- Region: Bauchi State
- Native speakers: (5,000 cited 1992)
- Language family: Afro-Asiatic: Chadic; West Chadic; Bole–Angas; Bole–Tangale (A.2); Tangale (South); Piya-Kwonci
- Dialects: Piya; Kwonci

Language codes
- ISO 639-3: piy
- Glottolog: piya1245

Piya-Kwonci (Piya, Pia, Wurkum) is a minor West Chadic language cluster of Nigeria consisting of Piya and Kwonci. The autonym for the people is Ambandi.
