= Maaka language =

Chadic language spoken in Nigeria

Maaka
- Maagha
- Native to: Nigeria
- Region: Borno State
- Native speakers: (10,000 cited 1993)
- Language family: Afro-Asiatic: Chadic; West Chadic; Bole–Angas; Bole–Tangale (A.2); Bole (North); Maaka

Language codes
- ISO 639-3: mew
- Glottolog: maak1236
- ELP: Maha

Maaka (also known as Maha, Maka, Maga, Magha) is an Afro-Asiatic language spoken in the Yobe State in North-Eastern Nigeria. As of 1993, it was spoken by approximately 10,000 people.
