= Fatima Talba =

Nigerian politician

- Born: Potiskum
- Citizenship: Nigeria
- Occupation: Politician

Fatima Talba is a Nigerian politician from Yobe State, Nigeria. She is currently a member of the House of Representatives representing Nangere/Potiskum constituency in the 10th National Assembly. She is the chairperson of women Parliament of National Assembly.
