= Giiwo language =

Chadic language spoken in Nigeria

Giiwo
- Bu Giiwo
- Native to: Nigeria
- Region: Bauchi State
- Native speakers: (14,000 cited 1998)
- Language family: Afro-Asiatic: Chadic; West Chadic; Bole–Angas; Bole–Tangale (A.2); Bole (North); Giiwo

Language codes
- ISO 639-3: kks
- Glottolog: giiw1236

Giiwo
- Person: Ba Giiwo
- People: Ma Giiwo
- Language: Bu Giiwo

Giiwo (also known as Bu Giiwo, Kirfi, Kirifi, Kirifawa) is an Afro-Asiatic language spoken in Nigeria.
