= Kubi language =

Extinct Afro-Asiatic language of Nigeria

Kubi
- Native to: Nigeria
- Region: Bauchi State
- Ethnicity: 1,500 (1995)
- Extinct: 1940
- Language family: Afro-Asiatic: Chadic; West Chadic; Bole–Angas; Bole–Tangale (A.2); Bole (North); Kubi

Language codes
- ISO 639-3: kof
- Glottolog: kubi1239
- ELP: Kubi

Kubi (also known as Kuba, Kubawa) is an extinct Afro-Asiatic language formerly spoken in Bauchi State, Nigeria. Members of the ethnic group now speak Hausa.

Kubi is a village that is known as a member of the Za'ar tribe and also speaks the same language.
