= Geruma language =

Afro-Asiatic language of Nigeria

Geruma
- Gyeermu
- Native to: Nigeria
- Region: Bauchi State
- Native speakers: (9,000 cited 2000)
- Language family: Afro-Asiatic: Chadic; West Chadic; Bole–Angas; Bole–Tangale (A.2); Bole (North); Geruma

Language codes
- ISO 639-3: gea
- Glottolog: geru1240
- ELP: Geruma

Gyeermu (Geerum)
- Person: na Gyeermu
- People: Gyeermu
- Language: Gyeermu

Geruma (also known as Gerema, Germa) is an Afro-Asiatic language spoken in Nigeria. Dialects include Duurum and Sum. Speakers are shifting to Hausa.
