= Bole language =

Afro-Asiatic language spoken in Nigeria

Bole
- bòo pìkkà
- Native to: Nigeria
- Region: Bauchi State, Gombe State, Yobe State, Plateau State
- Native speakers: 250,000 (2023)
- Language family: Afro-Asiatic: Chadic; West Chadic; Bole–Angas; Bole–Tangale (A.2); Bole (North); Bole
- Dialects: Bara; Fika

Language codes
- ISO 639-3: bol
- Glottolog: nucl1695

Pìkkà
- People: Am Pìkkà
- Language: Bòò Pìkkà

Bole (bòo pìkkà, also known as Bolanchi, Ampikka, Bopikka, Bolewa, Bolawa) is a West Chadic language spoken in Nigeria. Dialects include Bara and Fika, spoken in the Fika Emirate. It is spoken by around 250,000 people. Bole is written with the Latin alphabet. Bole has two tones, a high tone marked with an acute accent and a low tone marked with a grave accent.

== Phonology ==
=== Vowels ===
Vowels
	Front	Central	Back
Close	i iː		u uː
Mid	e eː		o oː
Open		a aː	

=== Consonants ===
Consonants
	Labial	Alveolar	Postalveolar	Palatal	Velar	Labial–velar	Glottal
Plosive	p b	t d			k g		ʔ
Fricative	f	s z	ʃ				h
Affricate			tʃ dʒ				
Nasal	m	n		ɲ			
Trill		r					
Lateral		l					
Approximant				j		w	
Prenasal	ᵐb	ⁿd ⁿz	ⁿdʒ		ᵑɡ		
Glottalized	ɓ	ɗ		ˀj			

== Alphabet ==
Bole alphabet
A	B	Ɓ	C	D	Ɗ	E	G	H	I	J	K	L	M	N	O	P	R	S	T	U	V	W	Y	ʼY	Z
a	b	ɓ	c	d	ɗ	e	g	h	i	j	k	l	m	n	o	p	r	s	t	u	v	w	y	ʼy	z
