= West Chadic languages =

Afro-Asiatic language branch of West Africa

West Chadic
- Geographic distribution: Niger, Nigeria
- Linguistic classification: Afro-Asiatic: Chadic; West Chadic
- Subdivisions: A.1: Hausa–Gwandara; A.2: Bole–Tangale; A.3: Angas; A.4: Ron; B.1: Bade; B.2: Warji; B.3: Barawa

Language codes
- Glottolog: west2785
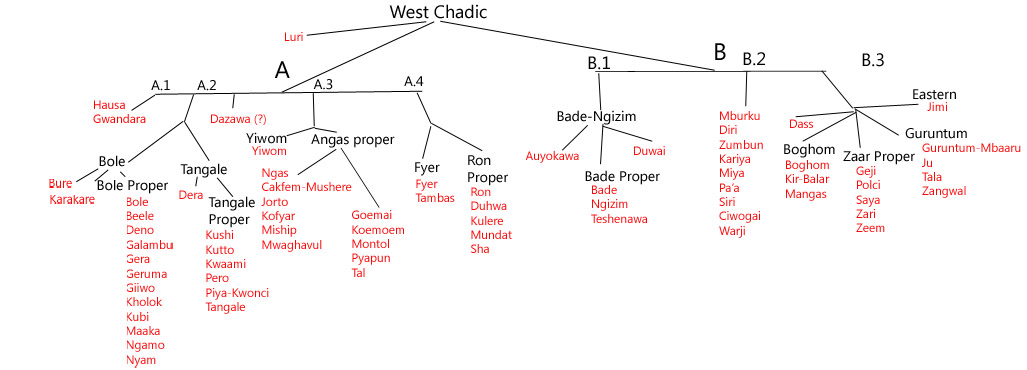
- West Chadic per Newman (1977)

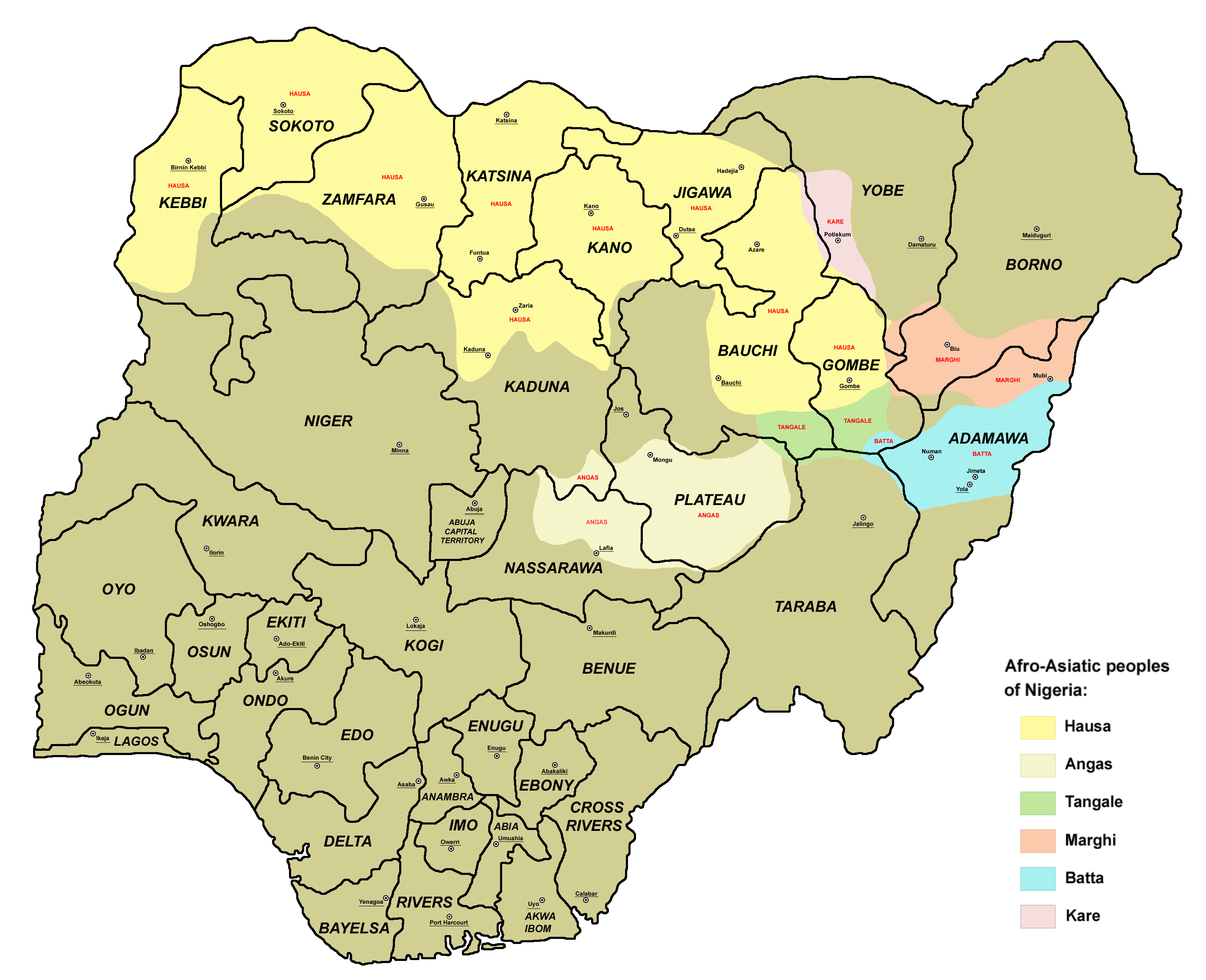
Main Chadic-speaking peoples in Nigeria

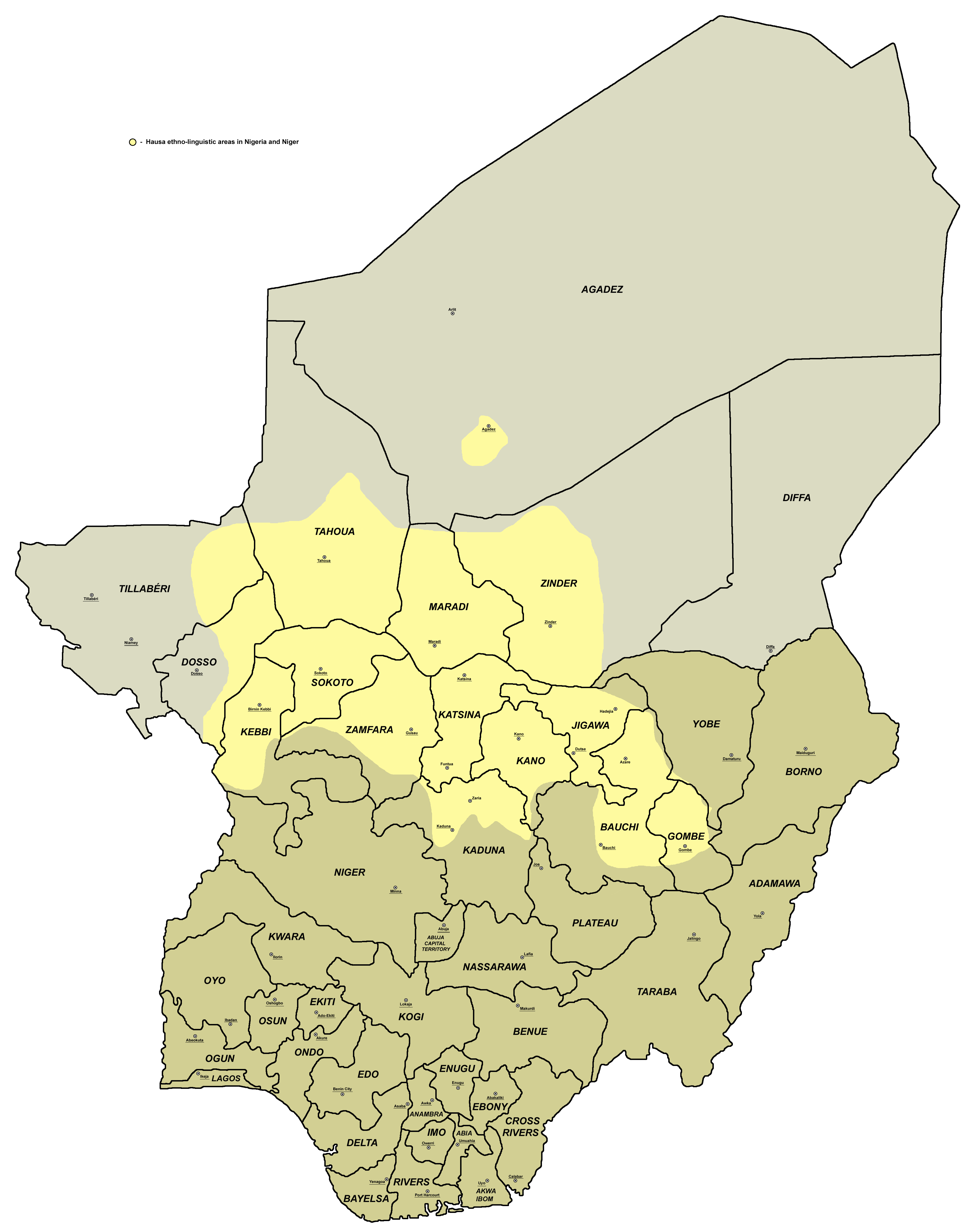
Hausa-speaking areas in Nigeria and Niger

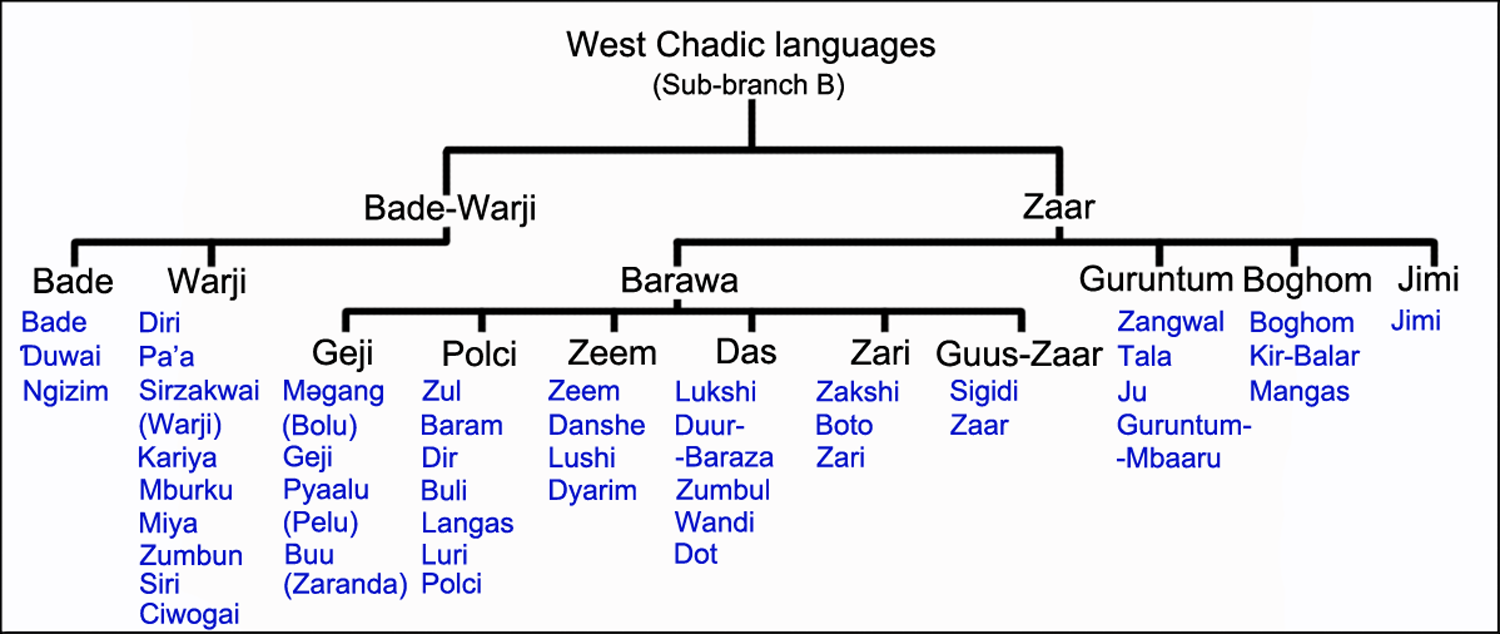
Roger Blench's (2020) classification of West Chadic B

The West Chadic languages of the Afro-Asiatic family are spoken principally in Niger and Nigeria. They include Hausa, the most populous Chadic language and a major language of West Africa.

== Languages ==
The branches of West Chadic go either by names or by letters and numbers in an outline format.

- West Chadic
  - Hausa–Gwandara (A.1): Hausa, Gwandara
  - Bole–Angas (?)
    - Bole–Tangale (A.2)
      - North (Bole proper): Bure, Karekare, Bole, Gera, Geruma, Deno, Galambu, Giiwo, Kubi, Ngamo, Maaka (Maagha), Ɓeele, Daza (Dazawa), ?Pali
      - South (Tangale): Kwaami, Pero, Piya-Kwonci, Kholok, Nyam, Kushi (Goji), Kutto (Kupto), Tangale, Dera (Kanakuru)
    - Angas (Central West Chadic) (A.3)
      - Ngasic: Ngas (Angas), Belnǝng
      - Mwaghavulic: Mwaghavul, Mupun (Mapun), Takas (Toos); Cakfem-Mushere
      - Miship (Chip)
      - Pan cluster
        - Chakato/Jorto
        - Jipal, Mernyang (Mirriam), Kwagallak, Kofyar (Doemak), Bwol, Goram, Jibyal
      - Nteng
      - Tel (Tɛɛl, Montol)
      - Talic: Tal, Pyapun, Koenoem
      - Goemaic: Goemai
      - Yiwom (Ywom, Gerka)
    - Ron (A.4): Fyer, Tambas, Ron (Bokkos, Daffo-Butura, Mangar, Monguna), Shagawu, Duhwa (Karfa), Kulere (Tof, Richa, Kamwai-Marhai), Mundat, Sha
  - Bade–Warji (?)
    - Bade (B.1): Duwai; Bade, Shira (†), Ngizim, Teshenawa (†), Auyokawa (†)
    - Warji (North Bauchi) (B.2): Pa'a; Warji, Diri, Ciwogai, Kariya (Vinahə), Mburku, Miya, Siri, Zumbun (Jimbin), Ajawa (†)
  - Barawa (South Bauchi) (B.3)
    - Zaar: Dass; Geji, Polci (Polchi), Saya, Zari, Zeem
    - Guruntum: Guruntum-Mbaaru, Ju, Tala, Zangwal
    - Boghom: Jimi, Jum; Boghom, Kir-Balar, Mangas

In addition, Poki is purportedly West Chadic, but no data is available.

== Internal structure ==
George Starostin's (2010) internal classification of West Chadic as presented in Blažek (2010):

- West Chadic
  - West Chadic A
    - Hausa–Gwandara
      - Ron
      - Bole-Angas
        - Bole–Tangale
        - Angas–Sura
  - West Chadic B
    - Bade–Ngizim
    - Bauchi
      - North Bauchi
      - South Bauchi

Roger Blench's (2021) internal classification of West Chadic:

- West Chadic
  - Hausa–Gwandara
  - Core West Chadic
    - Ron
    - Bole–Tangale
    - Bade–Ngizim
    - North Bauchi
    - South Bauchi, A3 (Central-West)

== Distribution ==
Distributions of West Chadic branches:

Distributions of West Chadic branches
Branch	Code	Primary locations
Hausa–Gwandara	A1	Northern Nigeria and Niger
Bole–Tangale	A2	Darazo LGA, Bauchi State; Yobe, Taraba, Gombe, Borno states
Angas	A3	Shendam and Mangu LGAs, Plateau State
Ron	A4	Mangu LGA, Plateau State
Bade	B1	Bade LGA, Borno State
South Bauchi	B2	Darazo and Ningi LGAs, Bauchi State
North Bauchi	B3	Bauchi State (Toro, Dass, Tafawa Balewa, Bauchi LGAs)

== History of dispersal ==
Roger Blench (2022) suggests that West Chadic languages may have spread via a gradual agricultural dispersal in Central Nigeria, starting from 3,000–4,000 years ago. Blench notes that West Chadic morphology has been heavily influenced by Plateau languages, likely as a result of long-term intermarriage that occurred as West Chadic incomers took local wives who spoke Plateau languages.

== Reconstruction ==
Although no full reconstruction of West Chadic has been published, reconstructions of numerals for West Chadic and its subgroups have been proposed by Václav Blažek (2018).

== Phonology ==
The labial–velar consonants /kp/ and /gb/, widespread in Plateau and other Niger-Congo languages but uncommon in Chadic languages, can be found in Ron languages and in certain West Chadic A3 and Bole-Tangale languages. These consonants were borrowed from Plateau languages due to intensive long-term contact. However, other phonological features typical of Plateau and Niger-Congo languages such as ATR and vowel harmony are not found in West Chadic languages.

== Numerals ==
Comparison of numerals in individual languages:

Classification	Language	1	2	3	4	5	6	7	8	9	10
A, A.1	Gwandara	da	bi	úkù / úɡú (Nimbia dialect)	huru / furu (Nimbia dialect)	bìyàri / bìyàr (Nimbia dialect)	ʃídà / ʃídə́ (Nimbia dialect)	bákwè / boʔo (Nimbia dialect)	tákùʃì / táɡə́r (Nimbia dialect)	tárà / tãrã (Nimbia dialect)	ɡóm̀ / ɡóŋ̀ / ɡwóm (Nim. dialect)
A, A.1	Hausa	ɗájá	bíjú	ʔúkù / ʔúkkù (West Hausa)	fúɗú	bìjár	ʃídà / ʃíddà (West Hausa)	bákwài	tákwàs	tárà	ɡóːmà
A, A.2, Bole	Bele	móoɗì	bòló	kùnú	fòɗɗó	bàaɗì	bàccímóoɗì	báawùló	ɓóorùɗó (2 x 4)	ɓòowùnò	bìmbáɗí
A, A.2, Bole, Karekare	Karekare	wáɗí	bèːlú	kúːnùː	fèːɗú	bàːɗú	bàcóːɗì (5 + 1)	bàcíbèːlú (5 + 2)	fífèːɗú (2 x 4)	ɓànnù	mbáɗ
A, A.2, Bole, Bole Proper	Bole	móoɗì	bòláu	kúnùm	pòɗɗó	bàɗì	bàššimóoɗì	báawúló	póorɗó (2 x 4)	ɓòonùm	bìmbáɗí
A, A.2, Bole, Bole Proper	Bure (Bubure)	móɗé	máló	kúnú	ʄóɗó	báɗé	básúmé	básùmáló (5+ 2)	ʄórʄóɗó (2 x 4)	ɓárdzìmóɗé (10–1)	bárbáɗè
A, A.2, Bole, Bole Proper	Galambu	múuri	m̀bàál	kúun	páryá	bòorí	bɪ́címɪ́n	bùcù m̀bàl (5+ 2)	hórró	bàryà múuri (10–1)	bár
A, A.2, Bole, Bole Proper	Gera	móóyi	mbùlú	kúnú	fúɗú	bàaɗì	bèeshím	bìccìmbùlú (5+ 2)	húrɗú	ɓànìnjà / barija	bàrɗí / barr
A, A.2, Bole, Bole Proper	Geruma	mô / mon	m̀bàalú / mbàalúŋ	kúnú / kúnúŋ	fúɗú / húɗúŋ	bàaɗì / bàalí	bècə́m	bàzə̀mbàalú (5+ 2)	húrɗú / úrɗúŋ	ɓár jà	ɓáráɗì / ɓárári
A, A.2, Bole, Bole Proper	Kholok (Widala)	ɗók	pèlòw	bùnùm	pèeròw	faàt / faàr	foòròmìnì	paàlìlàw	bìrbìròw / pìrpìròw	kómbóy	ɓùmmò
A, A.2, Bole, Bole Proper	Kirfi (Giiwo)	móoɗì	mbàlú	kúnú	fáɗáu	bòoɗ	bìccúuni	bìcímbàlu (5+ 2)	fórfáɗó (2 x 4)	bàr jà móoɗi (10–1)	pàtà
A, A.2, Bole, Bole Proper	Maaka	mōɗì	bòllu	kūǹ	paɗɗu	bà	bìnkinù	nɡā̀nù or bákwài (< Hausa)	jìlai	kwàlak	bìmba
A, A.2, Bole, Bole Proper	Ngamo	mòɗi	bòlò	kùnû	hɔ̀ɗò	bât	bàʔàʃìmòɗi (5 + 1)	babìlò (5 + 2)	hɔɔrɗò (2 x 4)	ɓònù	bimbaɗ (2 x 5) ?
A, A.2, Bole, Bole Proper	Nyam	mɔ̀dɔ́	fùllúk	kùnúŋ	hɔ̀dúk	hwàt	fármé	fáró fùllúk (5 + 2)	húrú ɡùdùk (2 x 4)	láɡó mɔ̀dɔ́ (10–1) ?	kùumò (litː ' kumo ' = ear)
A, A.2, Tangale, Dera	Dera (Kanakuru)	ɗuwey	rap	kunu	paraw	bât	byême	bwelà	torìmen	wanɗumwe (10–1)	ɡûm
A, A.2, Tangale, Tangale Proper	Kupto (Kutto)	ɗékkíré	fáláw/ páláw	kùnùŋ	fàɗàw / pàɗàw	fáat / páat	fáyɗìn / páyɗìn	fáyláw / páyláw	fàrfìɗòw	lèbìɗà	kómó
A, A.2, Tangale, Tangale Proper	Kushi	ɗòk	pə̀llòw	tàat	péeròw	fwàt / fúwàt	fàràɡbànàŋ	fàrlów	pìdiɗòw	fɔ̀jèràw	kpèmù
A, A.2, Tangale, Tangale Proper	Kwaami	múndí	póllów / fóllów	kúnúm	póɗòw / fóɗòw	páaɗí / fáaɗí	páyíndì / fáyíndì (5 + 1)	pópíllów / fófíllów (5 + 2)	pówùrɗòw / fówùrɗòw (2 x 4) ?	làmbáɗà	kúmó
A, A.2, Tangale, Tangale Proper	Pero (Pipero)	ɗók	bélòw	ɡ͡bónòŋ	béeɗòw	púat / fwát	páttira múndi	páttira bélòw	bídìdow	kómpòy / kómvòy	kó / k͡púmmò
A, A.2, Tangale, Tangale Proper	Piya	mùndí	pèelów	ɡbùnùm	pèeɗòw	fàat	pàtìrà mùndí (5 + 1)	pàtìrà pèelów (5 + 2)	pèdìpìɗów (2 x 4) ???	kòmbòy	kùmmó
A, A.2, Tangale, Tangale Proper	Po Tangale (1)	dɔk	ràp	kúnuŋ	pàdàó	fùwàt	pàíndì	pèláù	pàpádà (2 x 4)	làmbùdà	ɡ͡bɔmɔ
A, A.2, Tangale, Tangale Proper	Tangale (Shongom) (2)	dɔ́k	ráp	kúnúŋ	sɛ́rɛɪ̀	pʊ́wàd	páyɪ̀nɗɪ́	péelòu	párpàɗá (2 x 4)	lámɓɗà	ɡ͡bɔ́mɔ́
A, A.3, Angas Proper, 1	Angas (Ngas)	ɡàk	báp	kʷán	fír	pɛ̀t	pìmí (5 + 1)	pòbáp (5 + 2)	pòkʷún (5 + 3)	pòfár (5 + 4)	sàr
A, A.3, Angas Proper, 1	Kofyar	mé	vəl	kún	féer	paàt	pèmə (5 + 1)	pòɡòvəl (5 + 2)	pòɡòkun (5 + 3)	pòɡòfár (5 + 4)	sàr
A, A.3, Angas Proper, 1	Miship (Chip) (1)	kəme	vəl	kun	feer	baat	pemee (5+ 1)	pokvəl (5+ 2)	pokkun (5+ 3)	pokfaar (5+ 4)	sár
A, A.3, Angas Proper, 1	Miship (Chip) (2)	me	vɨl	kun	fɛr	paàt	pemɛ (5+ 1)	pɔ̀ɡɔ̀vɨl (5+ 2)	pɔ̀ɡɔ̀kun (5+ 3)	pɔ̀ɡɔ̀far (5+ 4)	sə̀r
A, A.3, Angas Proper, 1	Cakfem-Mushere	kume	vel	kun	feer	paat	peemee (5+ 1)	feermeekum (4+ 3) ??	feertiit (4 x 2) ??	paatmeefeer (5+ 4)	kakapaat (5 x 2) ??
A, A.3, Angas Proper, 1	Mwaghavul (Mupun / Sura)	mə́ndòŋ	və́l	kún	féer	páat	péemè (5 + 1)	póvə̀l (5 + 2)	pòkún (5 + 3)	pòféer (5 + 4)	kàapàt və́l (5 x 2) ???
A, A.3, Angas Proper, 2	Goemai (Ankwe)	mée, ɡə̀mée	və́l	kún	fə́r	pʰá:t	pʰə̀mə́ (5 + 1)	pʰə̀və́l (5 + 2)	pʰùkún (5 + 3)	pʰə̀fár (5 + 4)	sár
A, A.3, Angas Proper, 2	Tal	[mɛ́nɛ]	[vɨ́ɛ́l]	[kún]	[fɛi]	[pàːt]	[pɨ̀mɛ́]	[mɛ́fɛ́imɛ́kúːn]	[pàːfɛ́i]	[mɛ́ːpàː]	[sár]
A, A.4, Ron Proper	Ron (Daffo)	ɗaŋɡât	ful / fulál	yuhún	púʔ	hárá	makoŋ	melok	mafwaráʔ	yèlâm	hùrè
B, B.1, Duwai	Duwai	ɡùɗìyò	ʃirì	kô	fə̀ɗú	vā̀ɗ	ə̀jdə̀ɡərma	sə̀və̀sə̀ri / tlə̀və̀sə̀ri	ə̀jldàakò	wā̀rìyà	ɡùumà
B, B.1, Bade Proper	Bade	ɡàɗi	sərən	kwan	fəɗu	vàɗì	ə̀zdù	ɡatkasà	ɬədàakwà	warayà	ɡuumà
B, B.1, Bade Proper	Ngizim	kə́ɗə́n (counting), ɡàyí (enumat.)	ʃírín	kwán	fə́ɗú	vàaɗ	zə̀dù	ɡátkásà	dándàfə́ɗú (2 x 4)	kúɗkûvdà	ɡúmà
B, B.2	Dira (Diri)	num	rɔp	mɪyaxkən	wupsɛ	nəmtəm	mukkə̀	ŋyɪniŋɡì	wùzupsè (2 x 4) ?	vwanùm (10–1) ?	kwuɬ
B, B.2	Miya	wútə̀	tsə̀r	kìdi	fə̀ɗə	vàaɬə	màaha (5+1) ?	mààtsə̀r (5+2)	fə́rfəɗə (2 x 4)	kùcìyà	də́rɓitim
B, B.3	Dass (of Dott)	nə̀m	rwáp	mààɣí	wùupsí	nàmtám	màamaɣ / muumáɣ	wúsúrmàɣè	wúsúpsì (2 x 4)	nàturə́psi / nàtàrə́psi	zùp
B, B.3, Boghom	Boghom	nyìm	ɓáap / pā́p / ɡbwàap	mói	múpsí	ndàuní / ndóoní	màak	nyàŋɡí	ɓóopsí	ʔáamsóyìm (10 -1)	ŋəmàs / wuur nyìm
B, B.3, Boghom	Mangas	nim	ɓíin	mween	ùpsi	tùun	màɣà	nyíŋɡi	ɡàamzi	kúrúmsa	zúp
B, B.3, Eastern	Jimi	nintóo	rwá	mwaikán / mwenkán	ihyú	namtáŋ / namtám	máakoo	inkóo	ɡuhyú (2 x 4)	kə́skəníntoo / kə́zə̀kə̀níntò (10 -1)	ndəɓóo / ɗúbó
B, B.3, Guruntum	Guruntum	ʃàak	raap	miyaŋ	ooso	kʸuwun	môon	nʸeene	ɡèesau	ɗáar	zùp
B, B.3, Guruntum	Zangwal (Zangur)	nə́m	kwáap	màyà	wúusù	nàmtàm	màaɡa	nyínìɡì	ʔáasuʔáasù (2 x 4)	áatə̀nə̀n	súp
B, B.3, Zaar Proper	Geji (Gyazi) (1)	nə̀m	lôp	mèkan	wupsì	nàmtan	mukkà	nitɡi	wùsupsì (2 x 4) ?	topsi	kuɬ
B, B.3, Zaar Proper	Geji (Gezawa) (2)	nɨ̀m	lôp	mèkən	wupsì	nə̀mtəŋ	mukkə̀	nininɡi	wùsupsì (2 x 4) ?	nə̀topsi	kuɬ
B, B.3, Zaar Proper	Polci (Palci)	nɨ̀m	rǒp	miyèn	wupsɨ̀	nə̀mtəm	maɣà	wusɨ̀rmìyen (4 + 3) ?	wɨsɨpsɨ̀ (2 x 4) ?	nàtoropsɨ̀	zup
B, B.3, Zaar Proper	Saya	nàmbə́ŋ	mbə̀ɬíŋ	máajìi	wúpsə̀	nândə̀m	lîim	wátsə̀maí	tántán	tɔ́knándə́m	zúp
