= Hyam language =

Plateau language spoken in Nigeria

Hyam
- Jaba
- Native to: Nigeria
- Region: Kaduna State
- Native speakers: 300,000 (2014)
- Language family: Niger–Congo?: Atlantic–Congo; Benue–Congo; Plateau; Central ?; Hyamic ?; Hyam
- Dialects: Hyam of Nok; Sait; Dzar; Yaat; Ankung

Language codes
- ISO 639-3: jab
- Glottolog: hyam1245

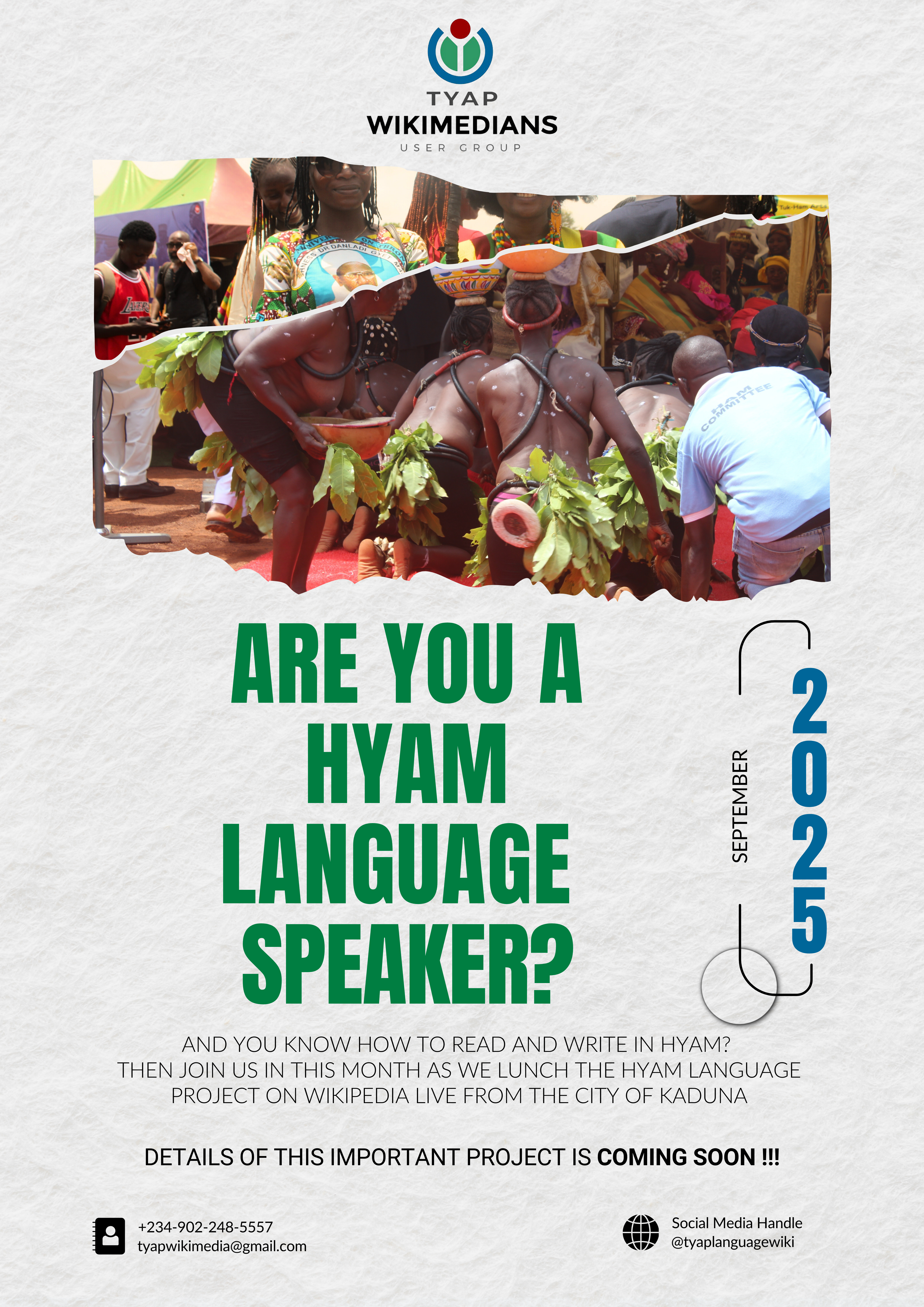
Hyam Wikipedia Outreach

Hyam is a regionally important linguistic cluster of Plateau languages in Nigeria. Hyam of Nok is the prestige dialect (Blench 2008). Writing the sociolinguistics of Hyam, Blench treats Sait, and Dzar as distinct varieties, and notes that Yat and Ankung may be viewed as separate languages, however, Hayab (2016) presents a differing opinion arguing that it is Ankung, a language called Iduya, that is not mutually intelligible to Hyam. Meanwhile, Hyam, which is spoken by the Ham people of Nigeria, popularly known as 'Jaba' in a recent study by Philip Hayab, a native of the area and a linguist who carried out in-depth research into the language, reveals that 'Jaba' has a Hausa etymology and is derogatory and should be discarded (John 2017).

== Distribution ==
Native Hyam speakers are found mainly in Jaba, Kachia and Kagarko. They are also found in Jema'a Local Government Areas of southern Kaduna State and in Keffi Local Government Area of Nasarawa State of Nigeria.

== Dialects ==
James (1998) classified the Hyam dialects according to the following sub-groups he placed under the Ham or Northern Group of the Proto-Plateau Ethno-Linguistic Cluster:

- Ham Kpop (Jaban Kwoi)
- Ham Ngat Ham (Jaban Katari)
- Ham Shambang (Samban)
- Ham Duhyah (or Idun) (Jaban Lungu)
- Ham Kworri (Chori)
- Ham Det (Faik/Kenyi)
- Ham Netkun/Netwho (Gbaham)
- Ham Nyakpah (or Nyankpa) (Yeskwa)
- Ham Kong/Rhuini (Kamantan)

According to Hayab (2016:5-11), however, the Ham people, aside migratory past, a subject requiring keen study, could be said to speak the following:

- Hyam Taa Ham - 'Hyam spread in Ham area' including Nok, Ghikyaar, Kuscum, Har Dzyee, Zhek, Shong, etc.
- Kwyeny - same as James's Hyam Kpop (spoken in Har Kwain or Kwoi)
- Kyoli - the dialect of the Kworri/Kwori (also known as Chori)
- Saik
- Shamang - same as Shambang

Hayab (2016:6) added that other varieties may also include:

- Dùya/Idúyà - same as Idun
- Gwora - Gora
- Yat
- Zhire - Kenyi.

Further more, Hayab (2016:8) classified these dialects into four clusters, A-D, according to their levels of intelligibility.

- Cluster A. Hyam Taa, Kwyeny, and Saik (all have not less than 90% phonological homogeneity in vocabulary
- Cluster B. Kyoli and Shamang (have about 50% intelligibility)
- Cluster C. Yat and Zhire (may be coherent with A and B. More studies needed)
- Cluster D. Idúyà [or Idun ] and Gwora (stand in an independent category)

Again note that Hyam is the language spoken by the Ham people.

Blench (2019) lists:

- Kwyeny
- Yaat
- Saik
- Dzar
- Hyam of Nok

== Orthography ==
The Hyam Literacy Committee identifies the following 41/42 basic symbols in its orthography.

a a̱ b c d dz e e̱ f g gb gh h hw hyw i i̱ j k kh kp l m n ng ny o p r s sh t th thn ts u v w y yw z zh

=== Vowels (Vawel) ===
- Monophthongs

Short Vowels (Vawella̱ Sha̱kuup)

a a̱ e e̱ i i̱ o u

Long Vowels (Vawella̱ Sha̱ceri)

aa ee ii oo uu

- Diphthongs (Khwikhwir Vawel)

ai au a̱u ou

=== Consonants (Konsonan) ===
b c d dh dz f g gy gb gh ghy h hw hwy hyw j k ky kh khy kp l m n nh ng ny p r s sh t th thn ts v w y yw z zh

== Numerals ==
Hayab (2016:66) pinpoints, stating that "available data in Hyam by Koelle (1854: appendix, 2-188) and Meek (1931:120) reveals that the Ham contest in virtually a dissimilar way from what is obtained today." He added that it is apparent that the old counting system has been replaced with a Hausa styled one, and again states that "at present, the old style with ten (which was kop) now as ' shwak '. A case points is kop (ten) shows to be an incomplete number observing the evidence that ' mbwan shwak ' (11) suggests that we were a number away from shwak (twelve)." He then added that "this is because the word ' mbwan ' actually denotes bwat - short of or 'remaining'.

The above can be said to be true, considering the case of Tyap, a related language, where the present word for ten is swak, while the word "kop/kwop" is almost extinct, just as in Hyam, and only used for counting in thousands. The word "thousand" in Tyap is cyi kop/kwop, meaning (considering the old usage of the word kop/kwop), "a hundred - ten times" or "100 X 10".

These, according to Hayab (2016:66-67) are the numbers used at least 200 years ago for counting in Hyam.

	Hyam	English
0	npiit	zero/nothing
1	zhinni	one
2	feli	two
3	taat	three
4	naang	four
5	twoo	five
6	twani	six
7	twarfo	seven
8	naarang	eight
9	mbwan-kop	nine
10	kop	ten
11	mbwan-shwak	eleven
12	shwak	twelve/dozen/complete
24	shwak i'feri	two dozens
36	shwak i'tat	three dozens
48	shwak i'nang	four dozens
60	shwak i'twoo	five dozens
72	shwak i'twani	six dozens
84	shwak i'twarfo	seven dozens
96	shwak i'naarang	eight dozens
108	shwak i'mbwan-kop	nine dozens
144/infinity	sok-sok-gha	twelve dozens/uncountable

== Lexicon ==
The following is an abridged lexicon via the Hyam wordlist by Roger Blench.

Hyam	English
bes	hot temper
bok	doctor, healer
bongyeny	toad
cheb	egg
chi	death
chin	bravery, courage
chirchi	morning
choing	reddish
chu	soul, spirit
chuur	spring of water
chuwo	penis
cen	guest, stranger
dung	depth
dwai	world, bush
dzaar	marry
dzam	young person
dzet	temptation
dzo	goat
dzom	elephant
dzut	mist, fog
dzye	power
fai	sky
fang	oath
fe	Moon
fet	kill
furi	burst out
fyen	flower
fyep	thief
fyet	shooting star
gaar/gyaar	place(s)
gab	divide
gam	level
gan	surpass
gang	open
gbyo	witchcraft
gom	song
guguk	tree bark
gwang	large
gyugyuthi	owl
ham	suck, roll
has	resemblance
hwom	horn
hyong	fear, fright
jaki	donkey
jang	leaf
jip	whirlwind
jo/wejo	mountain, hill
kab	large river
kate	road
kike/ke	father
kikera	ancestors
kom	corpse
kon	knife
koop	inheritance
kpoduma	cat
kpop	king, chief
kpyob	mushroom
kuko	firewood
kushat	ghost
kwai	female clan leader
kyaam	teach
kyang	farm
kyar	stone
kyat'pyo	divination
mat	birth
mek	year
mimyet	lie down
mogbam	granaries
monet	people
mowe/we	children
muri	hyena
myen	wisdom
na'hywes/ryat	witch
na'kyat'kpyo	sorcerer
nam	body
nanaa	blacksmith
ndwak	friend
net	person
ngan	proverb
ngot	rain
njaa	anger
nkuun	evil spirit
nom	Sun
ntato	hunter
nyak	cow
nyam	meat
nyo/monyo	daughter-in-law
nyang	scorpion
ran	lake, pond
re	today
reng	yesterday
ribi	land, country
rituk	night
ruing	greet
run	dust
ruth	tired
ryetuk	evening
saar	story, news
shabur	white
sham	lightning
shang	seed, grain
shantan	spider
shashat	dawn
shen	sex, intercourse
sheshit/sesit	black
shirshing	shadow
shisheng	wind
shozhi	woman
shushuni	breath
shuu	charcoal, soot
shwok	awaken
shwom	judge
sim	love
sung	snake
swat	dance
tamtori	crazy person
tirda	sister
titaan	water
tset	strength
tseyang	fireplace
tyeng	set on fire
wegyo	dog
wera	brother
wop	torrential rain
wok	get
yak	voice
yang	fire
yeer	meeting place
yeng	sheep
yet	star(s)
yosir	wrestling
zaam	laughter
zang	roam
zaki	lion
zhazhaku	butterfly
zheng	blow, flute
zhi	wife
zhii	blood
zhir'nkum	widow
zho	mother
zhu	room
