= Irigwe people =

Irigwe
Total population
- 40,000 (1985 IBS)

Regions with significant populations
- Nigeria

Languages
- Rigwe (Nkarigwe)

Religion
- Ethnic religion, Christianity, Islam

Related ethnic groups
- Afizere, Atyap, Bajju, Atsam, Berom, Tarok, Jukun, Kuteb, Igbo, Yoruba and other Benue-Congo peoples of Middle Belt and southern Nigeria

Irigwe people (Rigwe: Nneirigwe; Tyap: Á̱nietza̱fan; Hausa: Miyango) are found mainly in Bassa Local Government Area of Plateau State, Middle Belt (central) Nigeria. They speak the Rigwe language (also Nkarigwe), a Central Plateau language. Their headquarters is the town of Miango, west of the state capital, Jos. The Irigwe have been in the news in recent years on account of frequent attacks by Fulani militants.

== Distribution ==
Irigwe people are found in Bassa, Jos North and Jos South Local Government Areas of Plateau State and in Kauru Local Government Area of southern Kaduna State, Nigeria.

== Culture ==
=== Dance ===
On the dance pattern of the Irigwe, young Irigwe farmers usually leap to encourage the growth of crops at festivals related to the agricultural cycle. Other occupational guilds and professional organizations of experts, like blacksmiths, hunters, or wood-carvers, also possess their own expressive dances. Hunters may also possibly mime the movements of animals as a ritual means of controlling wild beasts and allaying their own fears.

=== Marriage ===
Walter H. Sangree wrote:

"The Irigwe marriage system in effect demands that men and women be married to several spouses in differing tribal sections during the course of their adult lives and precludes all divorce. It also ascribes patrivirilocal residence and assigns the paternity of each child a woman bears to the husband with whom she is residing at the time of the child's conception. Consequently women shift residence from husband to husband several times during the course of their lives, and unless childless they suffer intermittent separation from one or another of their dependent children. Spirit possession cults, involving nearly all the mature women of the tribe, supply both the emotional catharsis and the avenues for social integration to compensate the women for the repeated separations and social disjunctions the marriage system produces in their lives."

=== Leadership ===
Traditionally, the Irigwe is a segmented society devoid of a centralized political chieftaincy, with the highest authority traditionally accorded to the priestly elders of several tribal subdivisions which are in charge of the "all-important" ritual held for the well-being of the entire group of people or tribe.

== Religion ==
It was reported that a majority of the Irigwe people practice ethnic religion with about 62.0% of the total population, 28.0% being Christian adherents (Independents 55.0%, Protestants 25.0% and Roman Catholic 20.0%), while adherents of the Islamic religion contain the other 10.0% of the population.
