= Doka language =

Plateau language of Nigeria

Doka
- Ejuele
- Native to: Nigeria
- Region: Kaduna State
- Native speakers: (23,000; 11,000 cited 2000)
- Language family: Niger–Congo?: Atlantic–Congo; Benue–Congo; Plateau; Central ?; North Plateau ?; Doka

Language codes
- ISO 639-3: dbi
- Glottolog: doka1242
- ELP: Doka

Doka (Adara: Ejuele) is a Plateau language of Nigeria.
