= Gwara language =

Plateau language of Nigeria

Gwara
- iGwara
- Native to: Nigeria
- Region: Kaduna State, Nassarawa State
- Native speakers: a few hundred fluent speakers to < 3,000 with some knowledge (2009)
- Language family: Niger–Congo?: Atlantic–Congo; Benue–Congo; Plateau; Central ?; Koroic; Gwara

Language codes
- ISO 639-3: None (mis)
- Glottolog: gwar1240

Gwara
- Person: uŋGwara
- People: aGwara
- Language: iGwara

Gwara (iGwara) is a newly reported Plateau language of Nigeria. It was first noted in the literature by Roger Blench in 2009. There are marked similarities with the related language Idun, but some of these may be due to borrowing.
