= Adara people =

Adara
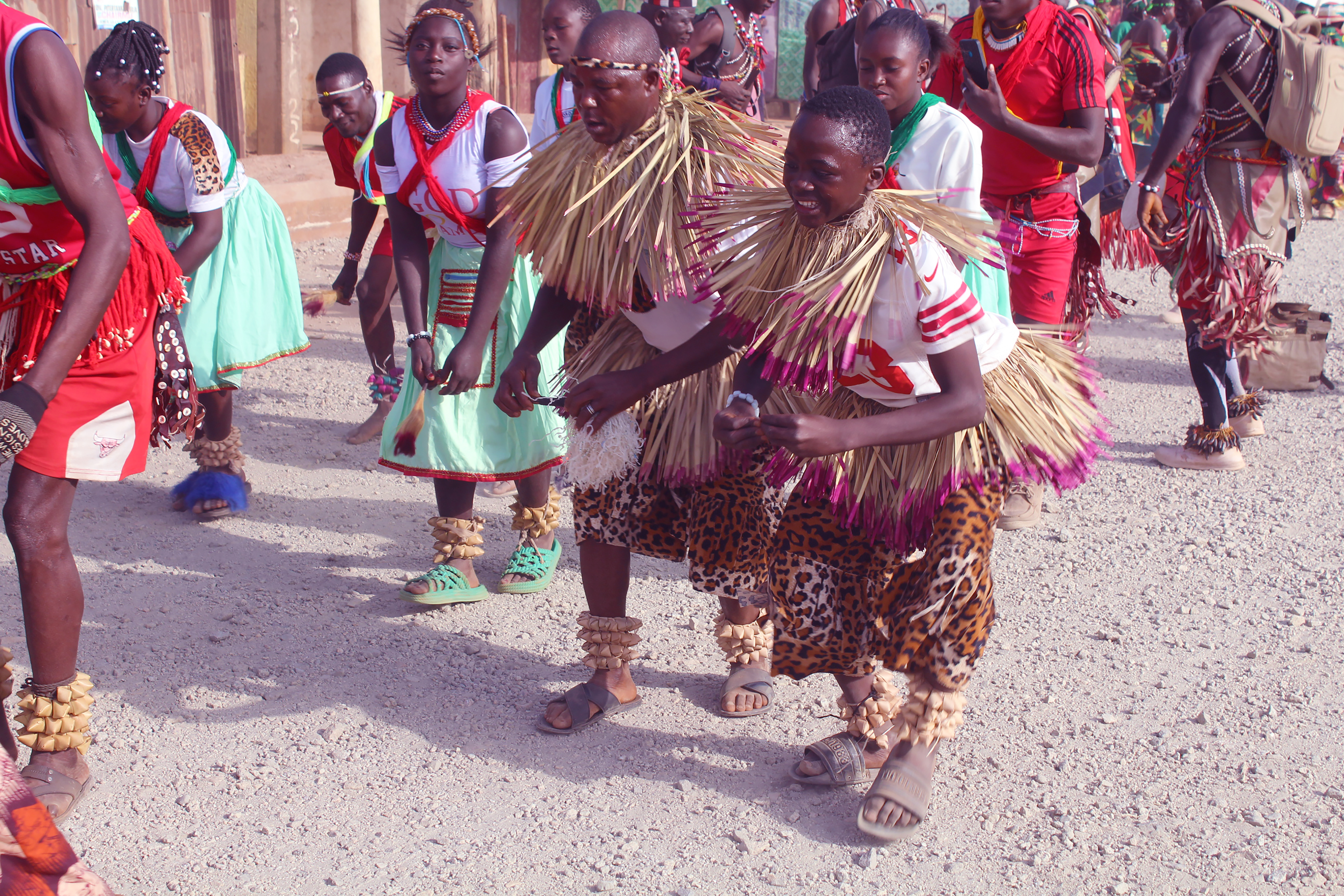
- Adara troup at SK Fest 2024

Total population
- 381,000

Regions with significant populations
- Nigeria

Languages
- Adara

Religion
- Christianity (55-85%), Traditional Religion (15-35%), Islam (0.1%)

Related ethnic groups
- Bakulu, Ham, Koro, Bajju, Atyap, Afizere, Berom, Jukun, Kuteb, Efik, Igbo, Yoruba, Edo and other Benue-Congo peoples of Middle Belt and southern Nigeria

Adara people (also Eda; exonyms: Hausa: Kadara; Tyap: Á̱nietswaywan), are an ethnic group in the Middle Belt who speak the Adara language, a north Plateau language of Nigeria.

Dio Awemi Maisamari is the National president of Adara Development Association (ADA) with his assistant Luke Waziri assistant secretary of the association.

== Demographics ==
Some estimates place the population of the Adara people at around 381,000. About 55% of the Adara are Christians while some also adhere to Islam.

== Location ==
Adara people can be found in the sub-saharan African Countries and they are only found in Nigeria. They can be found in Benue and some parts of Kaduna state like Kajuru and Kachia local government areas. Communities along the area include Magunguna, Idazo, Ungwan Galadima, Ungwan Guza, Etissi, Ungwan Ma’aji, Ungwan Dantata, Ungwan Araha 1 & 2, Ungwan Goshi, Ungwan Shaban, Ungwan Jibo, Ungwan Maijama’a, Ungwan Sako, Ungwan Maidoki and Ungwan Masaba.

== Crises ==
Adara people have suffered from ongoing communal conflicts in Nigeria, especially herder-farmer conflicts in Nigeria, including in Kaduna State. The President of Adara Development Association in a statement accused governor Nasiru El-rufa'i as the main agent behind there suffering. The people had also writing a letter to the governor indicating "we are suffering" from your leadership. Recall on the unfortunate slain of the paramount ruler of Adara Land, the Agom Adara, Dr. Maiwada Galadima, who was ambushed in October, 2018 on the Kaduna-Kachia expressway, after being abducted and later killed even after a ransom was paid for his release.
