= Tyap =

Dialect cluster of Plateau languages of central Nigeria

- Katab
- A̱lyem Tyap
- Native to: Nigeria
- Region: Kaduna and Plateau States
- Ethnicity: Atyap
- Native speakers: 255,000 (2020); 875,000 with Jju
- Language family: Niger–Congo?: Atlantic–Congo; Benue–Congo; Plateau; Central ?; Tyapic; Tyap
- Dialects: Fantswam; Gworok; Sholyio; Takad; "Mabatado" (Tyap 'proper'); Tyecarak; Tuku
- Writing system: Latin (Tyap alphabet)

Official status
- Regulated by: Tyap Literacy Committee

Language codes
- ISO 639-3: kcg
- Glottolog: tyap1238
- Glottopedia: Tyap
- Tyap is classified as Vulnerable by the UNESCO Atlas of the World's Languages in Danger

Tyap, Tyab
- Person: A̱tyotyap, A̱tyotyab
- People: A̱tyap, A̱tyab
- Language: Tyap, Tyab
- Country: A̱tyap or A̱byin A̱tyap

Tyap: Fantswam
- Person: A̱tyufantswam
- People: Fantswam
- Language: Fantswam
- Country: Fantswam or A̱byin Fantswam

Tyap: Gworok, Gworog
- Person: A̱tyigworok, A̱tyigworog
- People: Əgworog, Əgwolog, A̱gworok, Oegworok
- Language: Gworog, Gwolog
- Country: Gworog or Əbyin Əgworog

Tyap: Sholyio
- Person: A̱tyosholyio
- People: A̱sholyio
- Language: Sholyio
- Country: Sholyio or A̱byin A̱sholyio

Tyap: Tyeca̱rak
- Person: A̱tyotyeca̱rak
- People: A̱tyeca̱rak
- Language: Tyeca̱rak
- Country: Tyeca̱rak or A̱byin A̱tyeca̱rak

Tyap: Takad, Takat
- Person: A̱tyotakad
- People: A̱takad, Takad
- Language: Takad, Takat
- Country: Takad or A̱byin Takad

Tyap: Tuku
- Person: A̱tyituku
- People: Atuku, Atukum
- Language: Tuku
- Country: A̱byin Tuku

Tyap is a regionally important dialect cluster of Plateau languages in Nigeria's Middle Belt, named after its prestige dialect. It is also known by its Hausa exonym as Katab or Kataf. It is also known by the names of its dialectical varieties, including Sholyio, Fantswam, Gworok, Takad, "Mabatado" (Tyap 'proper'), Tyecharak, and Tuku. In spite of being listed separately from the Tyap cluster, Jju's separation, according to Blench R.M. (2018), seems to be increasingly ethnic rather than a linguistic reality.

== Distribution ==
Native Tyap speakers are primarily found in the local government areas of Jema'a, Kaura and Zangon Kataf, although pockets of speakers are also found in Kachia and Kauru in southern Kaduna state, and Riyom (especially Takad speakers) in Plateau State of Nigeria. There are also large speaking communities in Kaduna South and Chikun Local Government Areas of the state. Skoggard (2014) presented the distribution of the Atyap (Katab) people in Nigeria to include: Niger, Nasarawa, Kaduna states and the FCT.

== Classification and dialects ==
Meek (1931:2) suggested that the Katab (Atyap), Morwa (Asholyio), Ataka (Atakad) and Kagoro (Agworok) speak a common tongue and may be regarded as one; and later on, McKinney (1983:290) commented that the Kaje (Bajju) should likewise be included with the above, due to the linguistic and cultural similarities shared by them. Murdock (1959) classified Kagoro (Gworok) and other dialects comprising the current Tyap language group as "Plateau Nigerian", in his "Semi-Bantu" branch of "Bantoid subfamily" of "Negritic Stock". Tyap and Jju were placed by Greenberg (1963) under the "Plateau II" branch of the Benue-Congo language family. Later on, Gerhardt (1974) made a reconstruction of the branch, assigning it as "proto-Plateau". Again in 1989, Gerhardt placed Tyap and Jju under the South-Central subgroup, Central group, Plateau branch of Platoid, a division of the Benue-Congo languages. Achi (2005) stated that the Atyap speak a language in the Kwa group of the Benue-Congo language family. However, according to Bitiyong, Y. I., in Achi et al. (2019:44), the Kataf Group (an old classification) to which the Tyap language belongs is a member of the eastern Plateau. He went further to suggest that by utilizing a glotochronological time scale established for Yoruba and Edo languages and their neighbours, the separation of the Kataf Group into distinguishable dialects and dialect clusters would require thousands of years. Also mentioned was that,

Between Igala and Yoruba language, for example, at least 2,000 years were required to develop the distinction, while 6,000 years were needed for the differences observable in a comparison of Idoma and Yoruba language clusters

noting further that this indicates that

even within dialect clusters, a period of up to 2,000 years was needed to create clearly identifiable dialect separation, and it is thus a slow process of steady population growth and expansion and cultural differentiation over thousands of years.

He thereafter summarized that the implication for Tyap is that it has taken thousands of years to separate, in the same general geographical location from its about six most closely related dialects and stated that as a sub-unit, they required probably more thousands of years earlier to separate from other members of the "Kataf group" like Gyong, Hyam, Duya and Ashe (Koro) who are little intelligible to them. The stability of language and other cultural traits in this region of Nigeria has been recognized.

=== Dialects ===
Tyap has a number of dialects, including:

Dialect	Description
Fantswam (Hausa exonym Kafanchan, Kafancan)	Spoken by inhabitants of the Fantswam chiefdom in Jema'a LGA, earlier regarded as Kagoro (of Jama'a) not until about the late 1950s were they recognized as a separate entity. It is closely related to Jju, the Gworok and Tyap proper dialects.
Gworok (Hausa exonym Kagoro; Tyap proper Gwoot)	Spoken by the A̱gworok (also spelt: Oegworok), inhabitants of chiefdom bearing their name, in Kaura LGA. It seems like a 'junction dialect' between Jju and Takad and seems to be influenced by neighbouring dialects of the nearest language cluster, most notably Nikyob-Nindem and others.
Jju (Hausa exonym Kaje, Kajji; Tyap proper Jhyo)	Listed as a separate language (with the SIL code kaj, although its grammar and morphology are similar those of a Tyap dialect, with a bit of a variation in its syntax). It is spoken by inhabitants of the Ba̱jju chiefdom in Zangon Kataf, Jema'a and Kachia LGAs. It has the greater number of speakers of any Tyap dialect, and could have been deeply influenced by Izere and Rigwe (with whose speakers the Ba̱jju lived near Chawai with, in today's Kauru by oral narrative, before migrating to their present homeland several centuries ago). Jju was also probably influenced by the dialects of its present Hyam-speaking neighbours and former neighbours, to the southwest. These contacts seem to be the leading factor in its drift from Tyap in comparison to other dialects.
Sholyio (variant spellings Sholio, Sholyia̱; Hausa exonym Moro'a, Moroa, Marwa)	Spoken by the A̱sholyio (also spelt: Osholio, Aesholio, Asholio, A̱sholyia̱) people of the chiefdom bearing their name in the Kaura LGA. It seems to have been influenced by the Beromic dialect of Iten, Rigwe, and Gworok; its speakers share common borders to the east and south, respectively, with the people of the aforementioned.
Takad (variant spellings Takat; Hausa exonym Attakar, Attaka, Ataka)	Spoken by the Takad (Tyap proper A̱takat) of the chiefdom bearing their name, in Kaura LGA, Kaduna State and Riyom LGA, Plateau State. It is closely related to the Tyuku and Gworok dialects, as well as Jju. Although its speakers see themselves as brothers of the Ba̱jju (with whom they migrated from Chawai by oral narrative), Takat seems more related to the core Tyap dialects than to Jju, although it has some of its special elements.
Tyap proper (also Tyap-Central, Tyap Mabatado, Tyab; Hausa exonym Katab, Kataf, Katab proper)	Spoken by the A̱tyap people of the chiefdom bearing their name, in Zangon Kataf, also found in neighbouring chiefdoms in Kaura, Jema'a and Kauru LGAs. The dialect seems to be the mother dialect from which the others evolved, and was probably influenced by other languages, causing its drift from its parent proto-Plateau language root. British colonial anthropologist, Charles Kingsley Meek in 1931, classified most of the proto-Plateau ethno-linguistic groups as part of the "Kataf (Atyap) Culture Complex", speaking closely related dialects of a possible single language.
Tyecha̱rak (also spelt Tachirak, Techerak, Ticarak; Hausa exonym Kachechere, Kacecere, Kacicere; Tyap proper Tyecaat, Ta̱caat, Ta̱chaat)	Spoken by the A̱tyeca̱rak; (Tyap proper A̱tyecaat) people in the A̱tyap, A̱sholyio (Moro'a) and Gworok (Kagoro) chiefdoms in Zangon Kataf and Kaura LGAs and as far south as the Jema'a LGA.
Tuku (variant spelling: Tuku, Tukun, Tyukum; Hausa exonym Atuku)	Spoken by the Atuku (also Atukum) people in Jema'a Local Government Area in Takat chiefdom, around the Ni̱mbyio (also spelt Nimbio) forest reserve of southern Kaduna State. The dialect is often regarded as a dialect of Takad, and seems to possess the most language drift of any Tyap dialect, second to Jju.
Other dialects	Other dialects related to Tyap include Kulu (SIL code ikl, also an Adara dialect), Nghan (SIL code kcl, a Gyongic dialect) and Terri (SIL code cfd).

== Phonology ==
The Tyap alphabet (Zwunzwuo A̱lyem Tyap ji) had 39 letters, as drafted by the Tyap Literacy Committee (TLC) during the early 1990s:

Tyap alphabet: previous basic
A	A̱	B	CH	CHY	D	E	F	G	GB	GH	GHW	GHY	H	HY	HW	I	I̱	J	JHY	K	KH	KP	L	M	N	NG	NY	O	P	R	S	SH	SHY	T	TS	U	V	W	Y	Z
a	a̱	b	ch	chy	d	e	f	g	gb	gh	ghw	ghy	h	hy	hw	i	i̱	j	jhy	k	kh	kp	l	m	n	ng	ny	o	p	r	s	sh	shy	t	ts	u	v	w	y	z
Phonetic value
a	ə	b	t͡ʃ	t͡ʃʲ	d	e	f	g	g͡b	ɣ	ɣʷ	ɣʲ	h	ç	ʍ	i	ɪ	d͡ʒ	ʒʲ	k	x	k͡p	l	m	n	ŋ	ɲ	o	p	r	s	ʃ	ʃʲ	t	t͡s	u	v	w	j	d͡z

However, a current development as of 2018 has the Tyap Basic Alphabetical Chart reduced to 24, as follows:

Tyap alphabet: new basic
A	B	C	D	E	F	G	H	I	J	K	L	M	N	O	P	R	S	T	U	V	W	Y	Z
a	b	c	d	e	f	g	h	i	j	k	l	m	n	o	p	r	s	t	u	v	w	y	z
Phonetic value
a	b	t͡ʃ	d	e	f	g	h	i	d͡ʒ	k	l	m	n	o	p	r	s	t	u	v	w	j	d͡z

The letter "ch" would henceforth be represented by the symbol "c", without the "h". All others remain the same.

=== Vowels ===
	Front	Central	Back
Close	i	ɨ	u
Close-mid	e		o
Mid		ə	
Open		a	

The seven vowels of Tyap may either be short or long monophthongs sounds. The language has five (or six) diphthongs: /ei(/əi) ea əu ai oi/.

=== Consonants ===
The language has over 80 monographic and digraph labialized and palatalized consonant sounds, classified into fortis and lenis modifications. The following table contains the main basic consonant sounds of Tyap:

	Labial	Alveolar	Post- alveolar		Palatal	Velar		Labio- velar	Glottal
	Labial	Alveolar	plain	pal.	Palatal	plain	pal.	Labio- velar	Glottal
Nasal	m	n	ɲ			ŋ			
Plosive	p b	t d				k ɡ		k͡p ɡ͡b	
Affricate		t͡s d͡z	t͡ʃ d͡ʒ	t͡ʃʲ					
Fricative	f v	s	ʃ ʒ	ʃʲ ʒʲ	ç	x ɣ	ɣʲ	ɣʷ	h
Lateral		l							
Rhotic			r						
Glide					j			ʍ w	

== Syntax ==
Tyap has the SVO constituent order type as illustrated below in the first given example:

Shyimfwuo wan kyayak hu
Shyimfwuo cook.PST food DET
‘Shyimfwuo cooked the food.’

N na ngya bah
I will.MOD eat NEG
‘I will not eat.’

A̱li nung ka shyia̱ gbang
House my DET is far
‘My house is far.’

== Vocabulary ==
=== Affixes and concord ===
Tyap's noun-class affixes appear after its word stem. These affixes consist of prefixes, usually attached to the root of the word for pluralization. For example: a̱som (hare)—a̱yaasom (hares), bwak (hand)—mbwak (hands), a̱kwon (tree)—a̱ka̱kwon (trees), etc. Meanwhile, the CV suffixes—usually alternating, and following the noun, are usually rendered as separate words in the orthography. For example, a̱som wu (the hare), a̱yaasom ba (the hares), bwak hu (the hand)—mbwak na (the hands), a̱kwon ka (the tree)—a̱ka̱kwon na (the trees), etc. These constitute the nominal affixes and concord of Tyap.

=== Reduplication ===
Reduplication of nouns takes place for pluralization. Usually, the first root syllable gets duplicated. For example, tyan (place)—tityan (places), a̱nyung (tooth)—a̱nyunyung (teeth), a̱kwon (tree)—a̱ka̱kwon (trees), etc.

== Words associated with the alphabet ==
Letter	IPA Symbol	Tyap dialects and Jju	English translation
a	/a/	aba̱n	welcome (masculine)
a̱	/ə/	a̱gwam	ruler, king, chief
b	/b/	bat	wall, fence
c	/t͡ʃ/	cat (tsat in Sholyio, Takad, Tuku)	want, love, need, like
cy	/t͡ʃʲ/	cyat	cut/thatch grass
d	/d/	dam	to worry
e	/e/; /ɛ/	a̱lyem ( du̱ryem in Jju)	tongue, language
f	/f/	faat ( frak in Fantswam, Gwolok, Takad, Tuku)	to cut
g	/g/	gaat ( grak in Fantswam, Gwolok, Takad, Tuku)	(visitors' room)
gb	/g͡b/	gbang	far
gh	/ɣ/	ghan	to hurry
ghw	/ɣʷ/	ghwang	drawing
ghy	/ɣʲ/	a̱ghyang ( a̱yaan in Fantswam, Jju; a̱zang in Tuku)	another
h	/h/	hyet ( hywet in Jju)	arrow
hy	/ç/	hyenhyiam	sour
hw	/ʍ/	yihwa	what
i	/i/	ii	yes (feminine)
i̱	/ɨ/	ci̱p	twisting
j	/d͡ʒ/	jem ( zem in Sholyio, Cacrak)	hippopotamus
jhy	/ʒʲ/	jhyi ( jyi in Fantswam, Jju)	to repair
k	/k/	kan	medicine
kh	/x/	khap	cultivating
kp	/k͡p/	kpa ( kpe in Sholyio; kpi in Takad, Tuku)	to pound, pestle
l	/l/	li ( ryi in Jju)	to see
m	/m/	mup	to grab
n	/n/	nam ( du̱nam Jju)	meat, flesh, muscle
ng	/ŋ/	ngaan	to be last
ny	/ɲ/	nyam	animal
o	/ɔ/; /o/	long ( rong in Jju)	fire
p	/p/	piit	nothing, to lose, to score nought
r	/r/	ra̱ra̱k	to enter with ease
s	/s/	san	to receive, to save
sh	/ʃ/	shan	stick, staff
shy	/ʃʲ/	shyi	to swear
t	/t/	ta	to throw
ts	/t͡s/	tsang	crocodile
u	/u/	lyuut ( lyuruk in Fantswam, Gwolok; jem in Jju)	to write
v	/v/	vam ( lvam in Fantswam; lwam in Gwolok; rwam in Jju)	body
w	/w/	wan	to cook
y	/j/	ya ( [g]ye in Sholyio, Cacrak; [g]yi in Takad, Tuku)	to eat
z	/d͡z/	za ( ze in Sholyio, Cacrak; zi in Takad, Tuku)	rain

== Common phrases and sentences ==
Tyap	English (Shong)
A nyia̱ ni?	How are you?
N shyia̱ ka̱nɡka̱ra̱ng, n gwai.	I am fine, thank you.
A neet ma̱ a̱ji ni/wa?	Where are you from?
N neet a̱mali kya.	I am from home.
Á̱ ngyei ang a̱nyan wa?	Who are you called? (What is your name?)
Á̱ ngyei nung Kambai A̱ka̱u.	I am called Kambai A̱ka̱u. (My name is Kambai A̱ka̱u.)
Bai a ya kyayak.	Come and eat.
N fa̱k da̱ a̱lyem nung ka.	I love my language.
Á̱nienzi̱t ba neet di̱ fam Kwara-Apa hwa hwa.	The Nenzit people are from Kwararafa.
A̱gwaza gu nang ang/nyin nda. OR, A̱gwaza gu nang nda ang/nyin.	God bless you (sing.)/(plur.).

== Comparison of dialects ==
Comparing the cognate percentages between Kaje (Jju), Katab ("Mabatado" Tyap), and Kagoro (Gworok) on the Swadesh wordlist consisting of 118 items of core basic vocabulary, Wurm (1971), in his remark, stated that the cognate percentages indicate that the three ethnic groups speak dialects of the same language.

Kaje
84%	Katab	
83%	91%	Kagoro

_{Percentages of cognates on the Swadesh wordlist: Wurm (1971).}

With a further comparison of their kinship terminologies, McKinney (1983:291), after comparing 174 entries between the above three, found only eight to be non-cognate.

Kaje
83%	Katab	
83%	90%	Kagoro

_{Percentages of kingship cognate terms: McKinney (1983:291).}

Below are comparisons made by Akau (2020) between the seven Tyap core dialects and Jju.

	English (Shong)	"Maba̱ta̱do" (Tyap 'proper')	Jju	Gworok (Gworog)	Sholyio (Sholyia̱, Sholio)	Tyeca̱rak	Fantswam	Takad (Takat)	Tuku
1	Come and eat.	Bai a ya kyayak.	Ba a ya kyangya.	Bai u ya kyayak.	Bai a gye kyayak	Bai a gye kyayak.	Bai a ya kyangya.	Bai u gyi kyangyi.	Bai u gyi kyangyi.
2	Let us rise with strength.	Yok zi̱ doot yong ma̱ng cet.	Ryok zi drok ryong bu cet.	Yok zi̱t durok yong bi̱ cet.	Yok zi̱ durok yong ma̱ng tset.	Yok zi̱ durok yong ma̱ng cet.	Yok zi̱ durok yong bi̱ cet.	Yok zi̱ durok yong bi̱ tset.	Yok zi̱ durok yong bi̱ tset.
3	I am not going to the wedding.	N na nat la̱p nyeang (nyi̱yang) hu bah.	N ni nat rop nyreng a ba.	N na nat la̱p nyi̱rang ku dak.	N na nat la̱p nyi̱rang hu bah.	N na nat la̱p nyi̱rang hu bah.	N na nat la̱p nyi̱rang ku dak.	N li nat la̱p nyi̱rang hu dak.	N li nat la̱p nyi̱rang u dak.
4	The people are hungry.	Á̱niet ba fwuong zong.	Ba̱nyet ba pfong zong.	Á̱niet ba tswuong jong.	Á̱niet be fwuong jong.	Á̱niet be fwuong zong.	Á̱nyet ba tfwuong zong.	Á̱niet bi fwuong zong.	Á̱niet bi fwuong zong.
5	The child was walking, and fell down.	Nggwon ka ncong, ka̱ si̱ kwa a̱byin.	Ka̱won ka ncong, ka̱ yin kpa ka̱byen.	Nggwon ka ncong, ka̱ si̱ kwa a̱byin.	Nggwon ke ncong, ka̱ si̱ kwa a̱byin.	Nggwon ke ncong, ka̱ si̱ kwa a̱byin.	Nggwon ka ncong, ka̱ si̱ kwa a̱byin.	Nggwon ki ncong, ka̱ si̱ kwa a̱byin.	Nggwon ki ncong, ka̱ si̱ kwa a̱byin.
6	The pot is here.	A̱la̱n ka shyia̱ a̱ji.	Ka̱ra̱n ti shyi aki.	Ula̱n ka shyio a̱ji.	A̱la̱n ke shyia̱ a̱zi.	A̱la̱n ke shyia̱ a̱ji.	Ka̱la̱n ti shyia a̱ji.	Ula̱n ki syia̱ a̱zi.	Ula̱n ki syia̱ a̱zi.
7	They are too mouthy. God will help them.	Ba̱ la̱u byia̱ a̱nu. A̱gwaza/A̱za na beang mba.	Ba̱ ra̱u byi ka̱nu. Ka̱za ni mba brang.	Ba̱ la̱u byia̱ a̱nu. A̱gwaza/Uza na beang mba.	Ba̱ la̱u byia̱ a̱nu. A̱gwaze/A̱ze na beang mbe.	Ba̱ la̱u byia̱ a̱nu. A̱gwaze/A̱ze na beang mbe.	Ba̱ la̱u byia ka̱nung. Gwaza/Ka̱za na beang mba.	Ba̱ la̱u byia̱ unu. A̱gwazi/Uzi li beang mbi.	Ba̱ la̱u byia̱ unu. A̱gwazi/Uzi li beang mbi
8	Kuyet went to the forest with me to get water.	Kuyet nwuo a̱yit ka ma̱ng a̱nung a̱ bwuo a̱sa̱khwot.	Kuyet nwa ka̱yit ka ba̱ nzuk a̱ bvwa ba̱shekwot.	Kuyet nwuo uyit ka bi̱ nung a̱ bvwuo a̱sa̱khwot.	Kuyet nwuo ka̱yit ke ma̱ng a̱nung a̱ bwuo a̱sa̱khwot.	Kuyet nwuo a̱yit ke ma̱ng a̱nung a̱ bwuo a̱sa̱khwot.	Kuyet nwua ka̱yit ka bi̱ nung a̱ bwua a̱sa̱khwot.	Kuyet nwuo uyit ki ba̱ nung a̱ bvwuo sa̱khwot.	Kuyet nwua uyit ki ba̱ nung a bvwua sa̱khwot.
9	Who is home?	A̱nyan wa a̱ nshyia̱ a̱mali ka?	A̱nyan a̱mi a̱ nshyi ka̱ryi ka?	A̱nyan a̱ a̱ nshyia̱ buli ka?	A̱nyan a a̱ nshyia̱ a̱mali ke?	A̱nyan a a̱ nshyia̱ a̱mali ke?	A̱nyan a a̱ nshyia ka̱li ka?	A̱nyan a a̱ nsyia̱ buli ki?	A̱nyan a a̱ nsyia̱ buli ki?
10	It is above.	A̱ shyia̱ tazwa ka.	A̱ shyi tazwa ka.	A̱ shyio tuza ka.	A̱ shyia̱ tanzwe ke.	A̱ shyia̱ tanzwe ke.	A̱ shyia tazwa ka.	A̱ syia̱ tuzi ki.	A̱ syia̱ tuzi ki.
11	Will you drink?	A na swuo a?	A ni fwa a?	A na swuo a?	A na swuo a?	A na swuo a?	A na fwua a?	U li swuo a?	U li swuo a?
12	They said some children came here today.	Ba̱ nyia̱ mman á̱ghyang bai a̱ji a̱fwun ka.	Ba̱ yya na̱won ka̱yaan ba aki ka̱pfwun ka.	Ba̱ nyio nuwan á̱ghyang bai a̱ji utswun ka.	Ba̱ nyia̱ mman á̱ghyang bai a̱zi a̱fwun ke.	Ba̱ nyia̱ mman á̱ghyang bai a̱ji a̱fwun ke.	Ba̱ nyia mnuwan á̱yaan bai a̱ji ka̱tfwun ka.	Ba̱ hyia̱ mman á̱ghyang bai a̱zi ufwun ki.	Ba̱ shyia̱ mman á̱zang bai a̱zi utswun ki.
13	Eight of us.	Nzi̱t a̱ni̱nai.	Njit a̱ninai.	Nzi̱t unaimbwag.	Nzi̱t a̱ri̱nai.	Nzi̱t a̱ri̱nai.	Njit a̱naimbwak.	Nzi̱t unaimbwak.	Nzi̱t unaimbwak.
14	Let us unite.	Zi̱ tung ndung.	Zi tung ndung.	Zi̱t tung ndung.	Zi̱ tung ndung.	Zi̱ tung ndung.	Zi̱ tung ndung.	Zi̱ tung ndung.	Zi̱ tung ndung.

== Numbers ==
- 0: gum/piit/sa̱khat
- 1: a̱nyiung (also nyiung, jhyiung)
- 2: a̱feang (also feang, sweang)
- 3: a̱tat (also tat, tsat)
- 4: a̱naai (also naai, nyaai)
- 5: a̱fwuon (also fwuon, tswuon)
- 6: a̱taa
- 7: a̱natat
- 8: a̱ni̱nai (or a̱ri̱nai)
- 9: a̱kubunyiung

=== 10 to 100 ===
The numbers 11 to 19 are created by adding 1–9 to 10 with the middle ma̱ng (often shortened in pronunciation to ma̱ and the next a̱, e.g., in a̱fwuon, being silent) to the adjoining number, but usually each word is written in full: e.g., swak ma̱ng a̱fwuon (15).

- 10: Swak
- 11: Swak ma̱ng a̱nyiung
- 12: Swak ma̱ng a̱feang
- 13: Swak ma̱ng a̱tat
- 14: Swak ma̱ng a̱naai
- 15: Swak ma̱ng a̱fwuon
- 16: Swak ma̱ng a̱taa
- 17: Swak ma̱ng a̱natat
- 18: Swak ma̱ng a̱ni̱nai
- 19: Swak ma̱ng a̱kubunyiung

The numbers 20, 30, 40, 50, 60, 70, 80, and 90 are formed by replacing the prefix 2 to 5, affixed to the "swak" (ten) with n-, with the swak itself taking the prefix n- throughout:

- 20: Nswak nfeang
- 30: Nswak ntat
- 40: Nswak nnaai
- 50: Nswak nfwuon
- 60: Nswak a̱taa
- 70: Nswak a̱natat
- 80: Nswak a̱ni̱nai (or nswak a̱ri̱nai)
- 90: Nswak a̱kubunyiung

Other numbers are formed by adding 1–9, similar to the teens:

- 91: Nswak a̱kubunyiung ma̱ng a̱nyiung
- 92: Nswak a̱kubunyiung ma̱ng a̱feang
- 93: Nswak a̱kubunyiung ma̱ng a̱tat
- 94: Nswak a̱kubunyiung ma̱ng a̱naai
- 95: Nswak a̱kubunyiung ma̱ng a̱fwuon
- 96: Nswak a̱kubunyiung ma̱ng a̱taa
- 97: Nswak a̱kubunyiung ma̱ng a̱natat
- 98: Nswak a̱kubunyiung ma̱ng a̱ni̱nai
- 99: Nswak a̱kubunyiung ma̱ng a̱kubunyiung

=== Hundreds ===
Note that what could be termed as the "ancient" counting system used for 1-5 is usually used from 100 until infinity. 1 becomes jhyiung, and no more a̱nyiung. Same thing the 2,3,4 and 5 placed immediately after cyi, the word for hundred.

- 100: Cyi jhyiung
- 200: Cyi sweang
- 300: Cyi tsat
- 400: Cyi nyaai
- 500: Cyi tswuon
- 600: Cyi a̱taa
- 700: Cyi a̱natat
- 800: Cyi a̱ni̱nai (or a̱ri̱nai)
- 900: Cyi a̱kubunyiung
- 479: Cyi nyaai ma̱ng nswak a̱natat ma̱ng a̱kubunyiung

=== Thousands ===
Hayab (2016:66-67) in his research on Hyam, a related language to Tyap found out that the original word for number 10 is "kop"/kwop, and that the present word used for ten was the de facto word used for twelve or a dozen is "shwak" (in Hyam) or swak (in Tyap). Due to the growing Hausa/English influence, undoubtedly before 1920 (because Thomas (1920:59) cited an example with Kagoro (Gworok) which, unlike its neighbours the Nungu, Ninzam, S. Mada and Mama, was not using as of then, the duodecimal system), the counting system has taken the shape of the Hausa/English decimal style and the word "kop/kwop" became almost extinct, while the "swak" took its place and misplaced its original meaning, which is twelve, to now mean ten. With this in mind, when one considers the number "1,000" or cyi kwop jhyiung ("cyi kwop" is spelled one word), one can say that it literally means "hundred ten one" or "100 X 10 X 1".

Below are the modern Tyap Counting style in thousands:

- 1,000: Cyikwop jhyiung
- 2,000: Cyikwop sweang
- 3,000: Cyikwop tsat
- 4,000: Cyikwop nyaai
- 5,000: Cyikwop tswuon
- 6,000: Cyikwop a̱taa
- 7,000: Cyikwop a̱natat
- 8,000: Cyikwop a̱ni̱nai
- 9,000: Cyikwop a̱kubunyiung
- 2,018: Cyikwop sweang ma̱ng nswak ma̱ng a̱ni̱nai
- 10,000: Cyikwop swak
- 100,000: Cyikwop cyi jhyiung

=== Larger numbers ===
- 1,000,000: Milyon or cyikwop cyikwop jhyiung or simply Cyikwop a̱ka̱feang jhyiung
- 1,000,000,000: Bilyon or Cyikwop cyikwop cyikwop or simply Cyikwop a̱ka̱tat jhyiung
- 1,000,000,000,000: Trilyon or cyikwop cyikwop cyikwop cyikwop or simply Cyikwop a̱ka̱naai jhyiung.

=== Concord ===
Tyap has three ways of writing units 1-5. This is because concord in Tyap is brought down to only lower numerals and a few adjectives. The 'direct-copy' or 'echo' type of agreement in which the numeral has the same prefix as the noun it is in agreement with, is being followed here. For example, a̱ka̱sa (houses)—a̱ka̱sa na (the houses)—a̱ka̱sa a̱feang (two houses)—a̱ka̱sa a̱feang na (the two houses), nkyang (things)—nkyang na (the things)—nkyang nfeang (two things)—nkyang nfeang na (the two things), and nywán (fowls)—nywán ji (the fowls)—nywán sweang (two fowls)—nywán sweang ji (the two fowls). For the second example, an "n-" prefix is added to the lower unit when used with a plural noun carrying the "hu" singular like kyang (thing).

== Names for other languages ==
Some Tyap names for neighbouring and other languaɡes are as follows:

Language	Classification	Tyap name
Adara	Northern Plateau, Benue-Conɡo, Atlantic-Congo	Á̱niet Tswaywan
Atsam	Piti-Atsam, Eastern Kainji, Benue-Conɡo, Atlantic-Congo	Tsamyio
Berom	Beromic, Plateau, Benue-Conɡo, Atlantic-Congo	Kuut, Kuruk
English	West, Germanic, Indo-European	Shong; Nggi̱li̱t
Fulfulde, Fula	Central, Eastern Fula, Fulani-Wolof, Sene-Gambian, Northern, West Atlantic, Atlantic-Congo	Fa̱taa
Hausa	A.1, A, West Chadic, Afro-Asiatic	Kpat
Hyam	Hyamic, Northwestern, Western Plateau, Benue-Conɡo, Atlantic-Congo	Daa
Igala	Yoruboid, YEAI, Volta-Conɡo, Atlantic-Congo	Ga̱ra
Igbo	Igbo, Igboid, YEAI, Volta-Conɡo, Atlantic-Congo	A̱kum-a̱cyi; Igbo
Iten	Beromic, Plateau, Benue-Conɡo, Atlantic-Congo	Tyen
Kanuri	Western, Nilo-Saharan	Á̱niet A̱tyin, Ka̱nuri, Ba̱reba̱re
Kulu	Northern Plateau, Benue-Conɡo, Atlantic-Congo	Sunkurum
Nigerian Pidgin	Krio, Atlantic, English Creole	Shong Kaswuo
Nɡhan	Ninzic, Plateau, Benue-Conɡo, Atlantic-Congo	Byoot, Byorok
Nikyob	A, Southwestern, Western Plateau, Benue-Conɡo, Atlantic-Congo	Kuu
Rigwe	Southcentral, Central Plateau, Benue-Conɡo, Atlantic-Congo	Á̱nietza̱fan
Tiv	Tivoid, Southern Bantoid, Benue-Conɡo, Atlantic-Congo	Zi̱ya, Zi̱tya; Tivi
T'kurmi	Kauru, Northern Jos, Eastern Kainji, Benue-Conɡo, Atlantic-Congo	Wai
Yoruba	Edekiri, Yoruboid, YEAI, Volta-Conɡo, Atlantic-Congo	A̱ghwangkpang; Yoruba

.

== Related languages ==
A research list called the "Swadesh 100-word List" presented by Shimizu (1975:414) shows that Tyap (Katab) shares the following cognate percentages with fellow Plateau languages and Jukun beginning from the highest to the lowest: 72% with Izere (Izarek), 66% with Rigwe, 50% with Chara, 49% with Berom, 42% with Tarok, 41% with Pyem, 41% with Ninzam, 39% with Kuche, 39% with Eggon, 38% with Ibunu, 37% with Rindre and 34% with Jukun.

Cognate Percentages Shared by fellow Plateau languages and Jukun with Tyap
Languages	percent
Izere	72.0%
Rigwe	66.0%
Chara	50.0%
Berom	49.0%
Tarok	42.0%
Pyem	41.0%
Ninzam	41.0%
Kuche	39.0%
Eggon	39.0%
Ibunu	38.0%
Rindre	37.0%
Jukun	34.0%

== Endangered status ==
Research has shown that the Tyap language is classified as one of the endangered languages vulnerable towards extinction.

Language is the key to the heart of a people. If we lose the key, we lose the people. A lost language is a lost tribe, a lost tribe is a lost culture, a lost culture is a lost civilization a lost civilization is invaluable knowledge lost. The whole vast archives of knowledge and experience in them will be consigned to oblivion.

— Centre for Endangered Languages (1996).

A study by Ayuba (2014) showed that Tyap is endangered and that the Hausa language and the non-transmission of Tyap by the older generation of Atyap to the younger generation largely accounted for the endangerment of Tyap.

The study recommended, among other measures, that the Atyap Community Development Association (ACDA) should set up a committee to create awareness on the need for Atyap to rise up and save their language and another to work towards establishing vacation schools where older adults would provide pre-school child care where Tyap children could be immersed in the language.

== See also ==
- Jju language
- Kuteb language
