= Firan language =

Plateau language of Nigeria

Firan
- Fəràn, Fɨràn
- Native to: Nigeria
- Region: Plateau State
- Native speakers: 5,000 (2019)
- Language family: Niger–Congo?: Atlantic–Congo; Benue–Congo; Plateau; Central ?; Izeric; Firan

Language codes
- ISO 639-3: fir
- Glottolog: fira1238
- ELP: Firan

Fɨràn
- Person: yes Fɨràn
- People: yes Bèfɨràn
- Language: Fɨràn

Firan (also Fəràn or Fɨran; also Ibaas) is a Plateau language closely related to Izere. Most Firan speakers are multilingual in Firan, Hausa, English, Iten, and sometimes Berom.

== Villages ==
Fɨran is spoken exclusively in 15 villages of Ganawuri District, Riyom LGA, Plateau State, Nigeria. Kwakwi and Ntosso are the main villages.

== Phonology ==
=== Consonants ===
Consonants of Firan [SIL]
	Bilabial	Labiodental	Alveolar	Postalveolar	Palatal	Velar	Labialvelar	Glottal
Plosive	b p		d t			ɡ k	ɡ͡b k͡p	
Nasal	m		n		ɲ	ŋ		
Sibilant affricate			dz ts	d̠ʒ t̠ʃ				
Sibilant fricative			z s	ʃ				
Non-sibilant fricative	ɸ	v f			ç	ɣ		h
Approximant					j		w	
Tap/flap			ɾ					
Trill			r					
Lateral approximant			l					

Consonants of Firan [Blench]
	Bilabial	Labiodental	Alveolar	Postalveolar	Palatal	Velar	Labialvelar	Glottal
Plosive	b p		d t			ɡ k	ɡ͡b k͡p	
Nasal	m		n		ɲ	ŋ		
Sibilant affricate			ts	d̠ʒ t̠ʃ				
Sibilant fricative			z~dz s	ʃ				
Non-sibilant fricative		f						h
Approximant					j ɥ		w	
Tap/flap			ɾ					
Lateral approximant			l					

/Cj/ and /Cw/ sequences are permitted but are uncommon

=== Vowels ===
Vowels of Firan [SIL]
	Front	Near-front	Central	Near-back	Back
Close	i		ɨ		u
Near-close		ɪ		ʊ	
Close-mid	e				o
Mid			ə		
Open-mid	ɛ		ɜ/ə		ɔ
Open			a/ɑ		

Vowels of Firan [Blench]
	Front	Near-front	Central	Near-back	Back
Close	i		ɨ		u
Close-mid	e				o
Open-mid	ɛ				ɔ
Open			a		

=== Tones ===
There are 5 tones -- high, mid, low, rising and falling. The rising and falling tones are described as 'aris[ing] from sequences of level tones', but it is not clear what is meant by that, as there are no long vowels in the language.
