= Kuturmi language =

Plateau language spoken in Nigeria

Kuturmi
- Native to: Nigeria
- Region: Kaduna State
- Native speakers: (10,500 cited 2000)
- Language family: Niger–Congo?: Atlantic–Congo; Benue–Congo; Plateau; Central ?; North Plateau ?; Kuturmi

Language codes
- ISO 639-3: khj
- Glottolog: kutu1262
- ELP: Kuturmi

- Person: à-kró
- People: ā-kró
- Language: ìkryó

- Person: óbìrò
- People: òbírò
- Language: ìbìrò

Kuturmi, or Ibiro-Ikryo or Ada, is a Plateau language cluster of Kachia LGA, Kaduna State, Nigeria.

== Varieties ==
Varieties are:

- Ikryo (Akru, Aclo, Aklo, West Kuturmi), spoken in two villages of Kachia LGA
- Ibiro (East Kuturmi), spoken in Antara village, Kachia LGA
