= Zhire language =

Plateau language spoken in Nigeria

Zhire
- Kenyi
- Native to: Nigeria
- Region: Kaduna State
- Language family: Niger–Congo?: Atlantic–Congo; Benue–Congo; Plateau; Central; Hyamic; Zhire

Language codes
- ISO 639-3: zhi
- Glottolog: zhir1238 Zhire shan1278 Shang

ʃaŋ
- Person: u-ʃaŋ
- People: a-ʃaŋ

Zhire (Hyam: Zhebzhi, Hausa: Kenyi) is a pHyamic of Nigeria. A variety called Shang is relexified Zhire.

== Background ==
Zhire is spoken in Kagarko LGA, Kaduna State, Nigeria. It was also referred to as Kenyi in some sources. Its closest relative is Shang.

Zhire settlements, which are further subdivided into wards, are:

- Taha
- Gyeng
- Fei / Jenye
- Gidam (or Gidum Dutse)
- Kongo
- Foyour

Zhire clans are:

- Taha
- Gigamse
- Kwoyoro
- Fevi
- Gidam
- Hanziro / Gindu (These two clans merged for hunting purposes.)
- Fokyang
