= XSH =

XSH or xsh may refer to:

- XSH, the IATA code for Saint-Pierre-des-Corps station, Centre-Val de Loire, France
- XSH, the Pinyin code for Xushui railway station, Baoding, Hebei, China
- xsh, the ISO 639-3 code for Shamang language, Nigeria
