= Zhek =

Kurmin Musa Zhek, Zheky
- Village
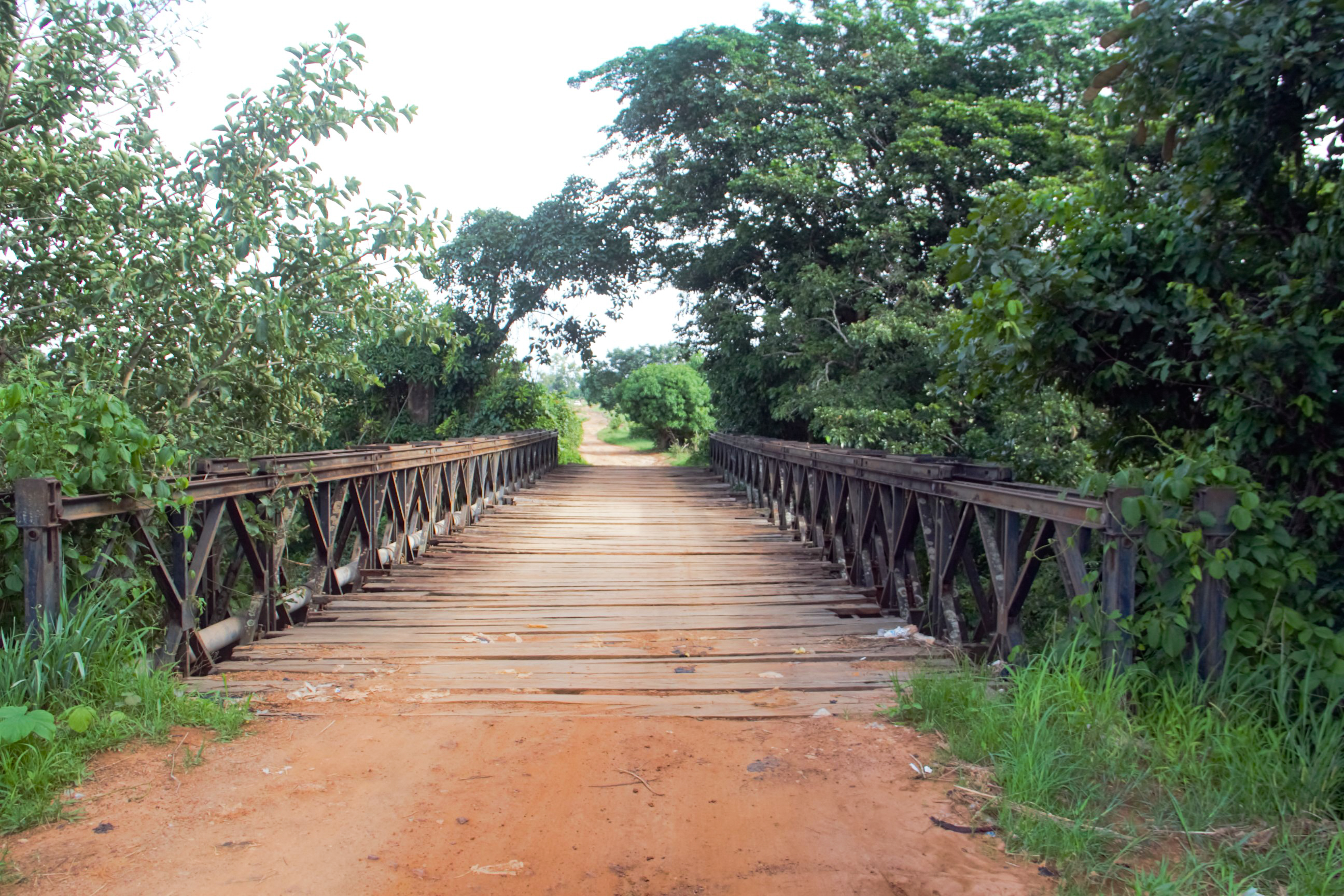
- Zhek Bailey Bridge, c. June 2022

- Location within Nigeria
- Coordinates: 09°35′02″N 08°01′09″E
- Country: Nigeria
- State: Kaduna State
- LGA: Kachia
- District: Ghiny (Sabon Sarki)
- Time zone: UTC+01:00 (WAT)
- Climate: Aw

Zhek, also Zheky (Tyap: Jhyek, Hausa: Kurmin Musa) is a village community in Kachia Local Government Area, southern Kaduna State in the Middle Belt region of Nigeria. The postal code for the village is 802117.

The area has an altitude of about 2,509 feet or 764 meters. The nearest airport to the community is the Yakubu Gowon Airport, Jos, located 49 nm E.

== See also ==
- List of villages in Kaduna State
