= Ajuwa language =

Plateau language spoken in Nigeria

Ajuwa
- Ajegha
- Native to: Nigeria
- Region: Kajuru LGA, Kaduna State
- Language family: Niger–Congo?: Atlantic–Congo; Benue–Congo; Plateau; Central ?; North Plateau ?; Ajuwa

Language codes
- ISO 639-3: –

Ajuwa (Ajegha) is a Plateau language of Kaduna State, Nigeria. It is spoken in Kalla, Afogo, Iburu, Idon, and Makyali towns. Ajuwa was reported by Roger Blench (2019), but is not reported in Ethnologue or Glottolog. Blench classifies it as Northwestern.
