= Ngyian language =

Plateau language spoken in Nigeria

Ngyian
- Kamantan
- Nghan
- Native to: Nigeria
- Region: Kaduna State
- Ethnicity: Anghan people
- Native speakers: (250,000 cited 1982)
- Language family: Niger–Congo?: Atlantic–Congo; Benue–Congo; Plateau; Central ?; Gyongic ?; Ngyian

Language codes
- ISO 639-3: kci
- Glottolog: kama1358
- IETF: kci

Ngyian (also known as Nghan, Hausa: Kamantan, Jju: Byrok, Tyap: Byoot), is a Plateau language of Nigeria. It is spoken by the Anghan people.
