= Yat language =

Plateau language of Nigeria

Yat
- Dangana, Kurmin Dangana
- Native to: Nigeria
- Language family: Niger–Congo?: Atlantic–Congo; Benue–Congo; Plateau; Central; Hyamic; Yat

Language codes
- ISO 639-3: None (mis)
- Glottolog: kurm1245

Yat (H.: Dangana, Kurmin Dangana), is a poorly known Plateau language of Nigeria. The people who speak Yat and their land are known as Ghat.
