= Bishini =

- Village
- Location within Nigeria
- Coordinates: 09°37′55″N 07°24′12″E
- Country: Nigeria
- State: Kaduna State
- LGA: Kachia
- District: Bishini
- Time zone: UTC+01:00 (WAT)
- Postal code: 802102
- Climate: Aw

Bishini is a village community in Bishini district of Kachia Local Government Area, southern Kaduna State in the Middle Belt region of Nigeria. It has two localities, New Bishini and Old Bishini. The postal code for the village is 802102.

Gunmen always attack the people in Bishini village.

== See also ==
- List of villages in Kaduna State
