= Shamang language =

Plateau language of Nigeria

Shamang
- Native to: Nigeria
- Region: Kaduna State
- Language family: Niger–Congo?: Atlantic–Congo; Benue–Congo; Plateau; Central ?; Hyamic ?; Shamang

Language codes
- ISO 639-3: xsh
- Glottolog: sham1277

Shamang is a poorly known Plateau language of Nigeria.
