= Iku language =

Plateau language spoken in Nigeria

Iku
- Iku-Gora-Ankwa
- Ekhwa
- Native to: Nigeria
- Region: Kaduna State
- Native speakers: 13,000 (2006)
- Language family: Niger–Congo?: Atlantic–Congo; Benue–Congo; Plateau; Central ?; North Plateau ?; Iku

Language codes
- ISO 639-3: ikv
- Glottolog: ikug1238

- Person: énéjì
- People: ánárè
- Language: ékhwá

Iku, or Iku-Gora-Ankwa (Ekhwa), is a Plateau language of Nigeria.
