= Jju language =

Plateau language spoken in Nigeria

Jju
- Jhyuo, Kaje
- Du̱ryem Jju
- Native to: Nigeria
- Region: Kaduna State
- Ethnicity: Bajju people
- Native speakers: 600,000 (2020)
- Language family: Niger–Congo?: Atlantic–Congo; Benue–Congo; Plateau; Central ?; Tyapic; Jju

Language codes
- ISO 639-3: kaj
- Glottolog: jjuu1238

Jju
- People: Ba̱jju
- Language: Jju
- Country: Ka̱jju

Jju (Tyap: Jhyuo; Hausa: Kaje, Kache) is the native language of the Bajju people of Kaduna State in central Nigeria. As of 1988, there were approximately 300,000 speakers. Jju is one of the Southern Kaduna languages. Although usually listed separately from the Tyap cluster, Jju's separation, according to Blench R.M. (2018), seems to be increasingly ethnic rather than a linguistic reality.

== Distribution ==
Jju is spoken as a first language by the Bajju people in Zangon Kataf, Jema'a, Kachia, Kaura and Kaduna South Local Government Areas of Kaduna state. It is also spoken in neighbouring Atyap, Fantswam, Agworok, Ham, Adara, and other kin communities as a second or third language.

== Phonology ==
=== Vowels ===
Vowels
	Front	Central	Back
Close	i	ɨ	u
Mid	e	ə	o
Open		a	

A few words also include the long vowels /aː/ and /oː/.

=== Consonants ===
Consonants
		Labial		Alveolar		Palatal		Velar		Labial–velar	
Nasal	plain	m		n				ŋ			
Nasal	tense	mː		nː				ŋː			
Stop	plain	p	b	t	d			k	ɡ	k͡p	ɡ͡b
Stop	tense	pː	bː	tː	dː			kː	ɡː		
Affricate	plain	p͡f	b͡v	t͡s	d͡z	t͡ʃ	d͡ʒ				
Affricate	tense	p͡fː	b͡vː	t͡sː	d͡zː	t͡ʃː	d͡ʒː				
Fricative	plain	f		s		ʃ					
Fricative	tense	fː		sː		ʃː					
Rhotic	tap			ɾ							
Rhotic	tense			ɾː							
Rhotic	trill			r							
Approximant	labial	w̥	w			ɥ̊	ɥ				
Approximant	lab. tense	w̥ː	wː			ɥ̊ː	ɥː				
Approximant	central					j̊	j				
Approximant	tense						jː				

- There is a tenseness distinction, which McKinney (1990) calls a fortis-lenis distinction. McKinney analyzes the fortis consonants as longer than lenis consonants.
- There is allophonic palatalization before front vowels and allophonic labialization before rounded vowels.
- Most consonants have a three-way contrast between plain, labialized [ʷ], and palatalized [ʲ].
- Aspiration [ʰ] may phonetically occur among stops.
- Tense stops /kː ɡː/ may also be heard as affricates [k͡x, ɡ͡ɣ].

== Numerals ==
Numeral	Jju word
1	A̱yring
2	A̱hwa
3	A̱tat
4	A̱naai
5	A̱pfwon
6	A̱kitat
7	A̱tiyring
8	A̱ninai
9	A̱kumbvuyring
10	Swak
11	Swak bu a̱yring
12	Swak bu a̱hwa
13	Swak bu a̱tat
14	Swak bu a̱naai
15	Swak bu a̱pfwon
16	Swak bu a̱kitat
17	Swak bu a̱tiyring
18	Swak bu a̱ninai
19	Swak bu a̱kumbvuyring
20	Nswak nh|c
30	Nswak ntat
40	Nswak nnaai
50	Nswak npfwon
60	Nswak a̱kitat
70	Nswak a̱tiyring
80	Nswak a̱ninai
90	Nswak a̱kumbvuyring
100	Cyi
1000	Cyikwop

== Vocabulary ==
List of vocabulary relating to body parts.

- zwuoi - nose
- shog - cheek
- a̱kpukpa ka̱nu - lip
- zwuak - throat
- du̱ryem - tongue
- pffwa - neck
- ka̱dyet - chin
- ka̱hog - chest
- trang - beard
- ka̱wiyang - armpit
- du̱ccu - head
- a̱nyyi teeth
- tsuo mbvak - elbow
- ka̱ma - back
- du̱kkwat - back of head
- tak - leg
- ka̱hwa - stomach
- du̱kkwut - knee
- hun-tak - ankle
- gruang - shoulder
- ka̱nu - mouth
- kop - navel
- pffwo - ear
- du̱ssi - eye
- a̱cat - hair
- du̱byiang - breast
- ka̱ta̱ssi - forehead
- a̱ta̱ngbak - wrist
- ka̱ta̱ng-hurung bvak - finger
- bva̱k - hand
