= Izere language =

Dialect continuum of Plateau languages in Nigeria

Izere
- Izarek
- Izere
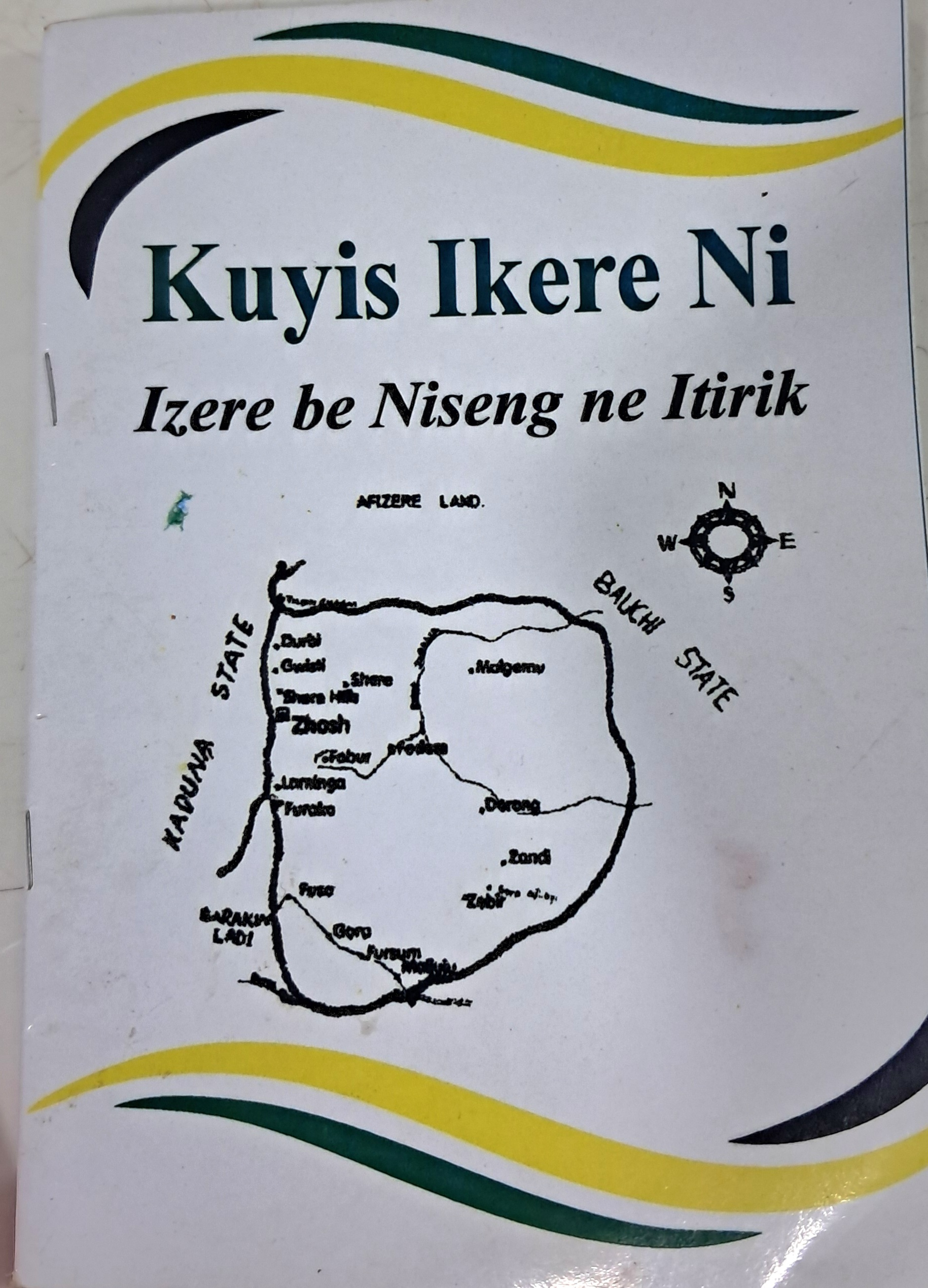
- booklet in Izere, "Kuyis Ikere Ni Izere be Niseng ne Itirik"
- Native to: Nigeria
- Region: Kaduna State, Bauchi State, Plateau
- Ethnicity: Afizere
- Native speakers: 500,000 (2006–2016)
- Language family: Niger–Congo?: Atlantic–Congo; Benue–Congo; Plateau; Central ?; Izeric; Izere

Language codes
- ISO 639-3: fiz – inclusive code (retired); Individual codes: izr – NE & NW Izere cen – Cèn (Chen) gne – Ganàng (Gashish)
- Glottolog: None izer1242 Izeric, incl. Firan

Izere is a dialect continuum of Plateau languages in Nigeria. According to Blench (2008), it is four languages, though Ethnologue does not distinguish NW and NE Izere. The Cen and Ganang varieties are spoken by only 2000 each. Cen has added Berom noun-class prefixes and consonant alternation to an Izere base.

== Dialects ==
Blench (2019) lists the following Izere dialects.

- Fobur
- Northeastern (Federe)
- Southern (Foron)
- Ichèn
- Faishang
- Ganang

== Phonology ==
The Izere phonetic inventory includes 29 consonants and seven vowels and distinguishes three tone levels; two additional contour tones appear only rarely, in loanwords and due to onomatopoeia.

=== Consonants ===
The consonant phonemes of Izere are shown in the following table.

	Bilabial	Labiodental	Alveolar	Palato-alveolar	Palatal	Velar	Labial–velar	Glottal
Stop	p b		t d		c ɟ	k ɡ	k͡p ɡ͡b	
Nasal		m	n		ɲ	ŋ	ŋ͡m	
Trill			(r)					
Fricative		f v	s z	ʃ ʒ				h
Affricate			ts					
Approximant					j, ɥ		w	
Lateral			l					

=== Vowels ===
The vowel phonemes of Izere are shown in the following table.

Vowel phonemes
	Front	Back
Close	i	u
Close-mid	e	o
Open-mid	ɛ	
Open	a	

=== Tonemes ===
There are three level (L, M & H) and two contour tonemes (LM & HL) in Izere; the latter two are found only in loanwords and onomatopoeia.
