= Kyoli language =

Plateau language spoken in Nigeria

Kyoli
- Cori
- Kyoll
- Native to: Jaba LGA, Nigeria
- Region: Kaduna State
- Native speakers: 7,000-8,000 (2020)
- Language family: Niger–Congo?: Atlantic–Congo; Benue–Congo; Plateau; Central ?; Hyamic ?; Kyoli

Language codes
- ISO 639-3: cry
- Glottolog: cori1240

- People: Kwoli
- Language: Kyoli

The Kyoli or Cori (Chori) language is a Plateau language spoken in Southern Kaduna State, Nigeria.

== Overview ==
It is spoken in the northeast of Nok in Jaba Local Government Area (LGA), Kaduna State. The speakers prefer to spell the name of their language as Kyoli, which is pronounced [kjoli] or [çjoli]. The ethnic group is referred to as kwoli.

There are about 7,000-8,000 Kyoli speakers living in the two village clusters of Hal-Kyoli and Bobang. Bobang is the cultural center of the Kyoli-speaking area. Bobang village cluster consists of the five hamlets of Bobang, Fadek, Akoli, Hagong, and Nyamten. Hal-Kyoli village is situated by itself. All of the Kwoli villages surround the foot of Egu-Kyoli Hill, which rises more than 240 meters above the villages.

== Tone ==
Cori is known for having six distinct levels of tone, too many to transcribe using the International Phonetic Alphabet, which allows five. However, there are only three underlying tones: 1 (top), 4 (mid), and 6 (bottom), which are all that need to be written for literacy. Most cases of Tone 2 (high) are a result of tone sandhi, with 4 becoming 2 before 1. Tones 3 (mid-high) and 5 (low) can be analysed as contour tones, with underlying /1͡6/ realised as [3] and /2͡6/ realised as [5].

In order to transcribe the surface tones without numerals (which are ambiguous), an extra diacritic is needed, as is common for four-level languages in Central America:

1 [ő] (top)
2 [ó] (high)
3 [o̍] (mid-high)
4 [ō] (mid)
5 [ò] (low)
6 [ȍ] (bottom)

== Numerals ==
Kyoli numerals in different dialects:

No.	English	Bobang dialect	Hal-Kyoli dialect
1	one	zìní	zìní
2	two	fɑ́lì	fɑ́lì
3	three	tɑ́r	tɑ́r
4	four	nɑ̀ŋ	nɑ̀ŋ
5	five	tû	to
6	six	fʷùín	fʷùín
7	seven	tofaːl	tofaːl
8	eight	nɑ̀naŋ	nɑ̀naŋ
9	nine	nbǒmkùp	nbǒmkùp
10	ten	sók	sɔ́k
