= Idon language =

Plateau language of Nigeria

Idon
- Ajiya
- Native to: Nigeria
- Region: Kaduna State
- Native speakers: 5,000 (2011)
- Language family: Niger–Congo?: Atlantic–Congo; Benue–Congo; Plateau; Central ?; North Plateau ?; Idon

Language codes
- ISO 639-3: idc
- Glottolog: idon1238
- ELP: Idon

Idon (Idong) or Ajiya, is a Plateau language of Nigeria.
