= Bajju people =

Ethnic group in Middle Belt, Nigeria

Bajju
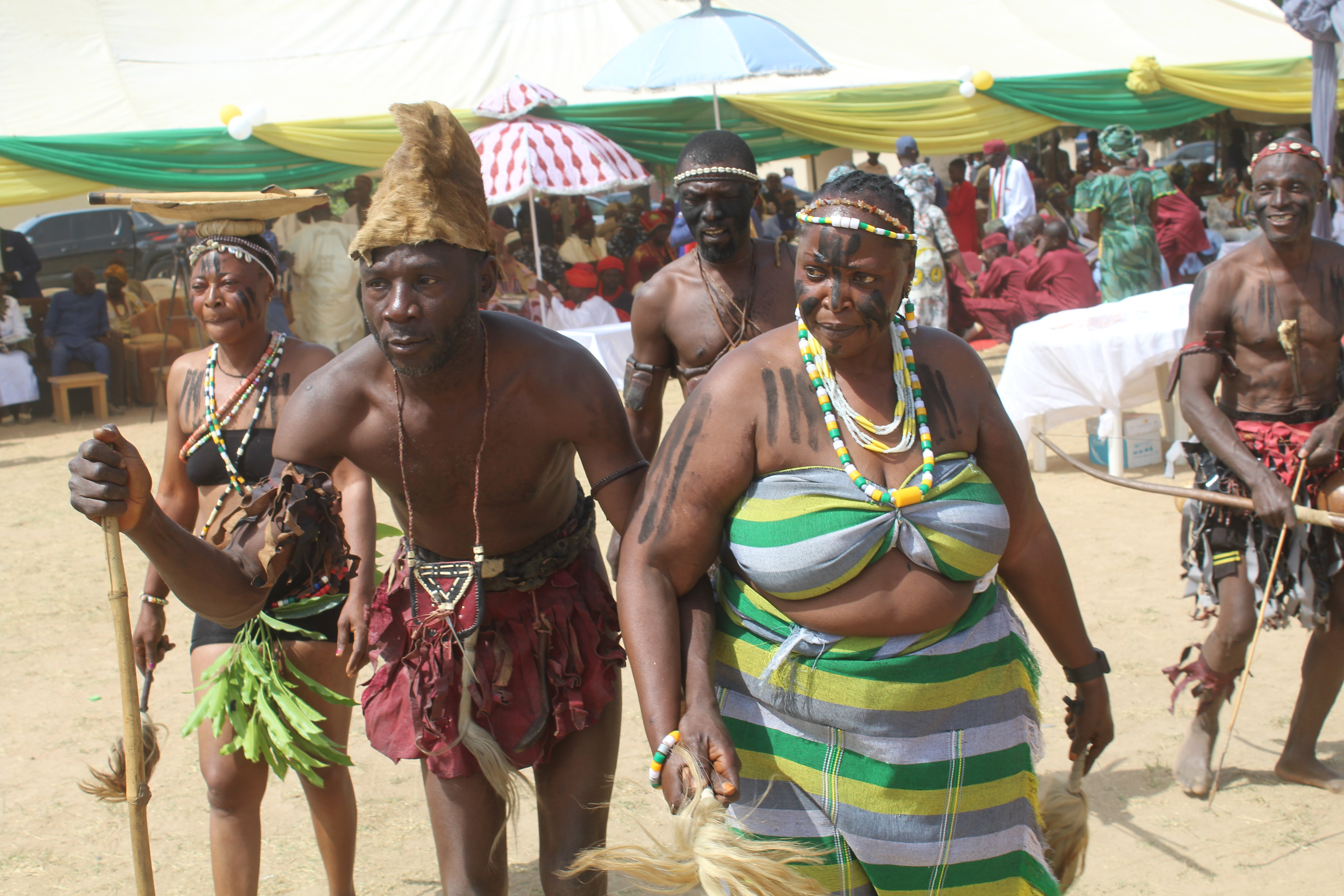
- Nom Bajju 2025

Total population
- 610,000 (2020 SIL)

Regions with significant populations
- Nigeria

Languages
- Jju

Religion
- Christianity, A̠bvoi

Related ethnic groups
- Atyap, Ham, Bakulu, Afizere, Irigwe, Berom, Jukun, Kuteb and other Platoid peoples of the Middle Belt, Tiv, Igbo, Yoruba, Edo, Efik and other Benue-Congo peoples of Middle Belt and southern Nigeria

The Bajju people (Jju: Ba̱jju; exonyms: Tyap: A̱jhyuo; Hausa: Kajje, Kaje), are an ethnic group found in the Middle Belt (central) area of Nigeria. The word Bajju stems from Ba̠nyet Jju, literally "people who speak Jju". The Jju language is spoken in Ka̠jju, the homeland of the Bajju people. They are primarily found in the southern part of Kaduna State, chiefly in Kachia, Zangon Kataf, Jema'a and in Kaduna South Local Government Areas. Bajju people are also commonly known as "Kaje" which is a pejorative name used to refer to both the Bajju people and their language, Jju, by the larger Hausa people who mispronounced "Kajju" (meaning the land of the Bajju people). The people are predominantly farmers, hunters, blacksmiths and small traders.

== Origin and history ==
=== Migration ===
According to oral history, the origin of the Bajju can be traced as far as Bauchi State where a group of people lived in hill caves and had watchers atop the hill to watch for enemies. These people were called the "Mountains peoples" (Jju: ba̱nyet tsok, Hausa: mutanen duwatsu. It was believed that their migration was for the search of better hunting grounds. They migrated from the Bauchi state part of the Jos-Bauchi high plateau and settled on a hill called 'Hurruang' in the Plateau state part of the area, in central Nigeria. The hill was already occupied by the Afizere, who left and lived on another hill called 'Tsok-kwon' (in Jju), probably same as Shere hills.

The Afizere also lay claims to migrating from the 'Miango' area, presently occupied by the Irigwe. The Bajju, Irigwe, and Afizere tribes collectively called themselves Dangi (meaning 'those of same stock', rendered in the Hausa language) because they share cultural and linguistic similarities.

=== Ancestry myth ===
Two brothers named Zampara and Wai were said to have left ‘Dangi’ settlement and migrated South of the Plateau. The Atsam (also known as 'Chawai') people of today are the descendants Wai. Wai settled at a place and named it Chawai. Considering that the forefathers of both the Bajju and Chawai (Atsam) people had family ties, it made both of the nations affiliated.

Zampara migrated further and settled at Hurbuang, which is now called Ungwan Tabo. Zampara had a wife named Adama (who was a Fulani woman) and gave birth to two sons, Baranzan and Akad. When Zampara, their father died, Akad left his elder brother Baranzan and stayed near the hills. He did so and became the ancestor of the Takad people. That was how the Takad tribe got associated with the Bajju. It was because of this close relationship that the Takad and Bajju people made it a tradition and a religious law never to intermarry.

==== Descendants of Baranzan ====
Baranzan had five sons namely:

1. Ankwak – was the eldest son of Baranzan. He had the following children: Kamurum, Akurdan, Kpunyai, Azawuru, Katsiik, Gatun, Byet, Duhuan, Atachab, Rikawan, Chenchuuk, Rikayakwon, Zibvong, Kamasa, Ankpang, and Byena.
2. Tuan – the second son had the following children: Zankirwa, Atutyen, Kukwan, Bvongkpang, Zat, Furgyam, Sansun, Kamantsok, Dinyring, Amankwo, Kpong, Zantun, and Dichu-adon.
3. A̠kadon – the third child had the following children: Tsoriyang, Wadon, Rebvok, Abvong, and Chiyua.
4. Kanshuwa – the fourth child had the following children: Jei, Dihwugwai, Zagwom, Tabak, Baihom, Bairuap, and Zambyin.
5. Iduang – the fifth and last born of Baranzan had the following children: Zuturung, Zunkwa, Zansak, Dibyii, and Abvo.

However, some Bajju and Takad people intermarried, and this caused the widespread death of 1970, Gaiya (2013). The Gado of Bajju, along with his people, met with the Gado of Takad, along with his people, to discuss the crisis of frequent deaths of people of both tribes as a result of the intermarriages. They later reached a decision to abolish the law religiously and traditionally so that there would not be any consequence for the intermarriage. That was how the Takad and Bajju people began to intermarry freely.

The previously mentioned Baranzan (son of Zampara, and brother of Akad) left Hurbuang (Tyap: A̱fabwang) and cleared a place by a riverside called 'Duccuu Chen'. He settled the Bajju there. The word 'Kajju' used for the land of the Bajju, was derived from the name which Baranzan gave the new settlement, which was Ka̠zzu.

Although it is unclear from oral history when the migration occurred, but evidence suggests that the Bajju were already in their current location by the early 1800s, Gaiya (2013).

== Culture ==
=== Bajju witchcraft and rites ===
There are many rites in Kajju land such as things like rain, farming, harvest, new house, pregnancy, and child-naming. Tyyi Tson (Euthanasia): Tyyi Tson means 'to give hungry rice' (hungry rice was a type of rice which the Bajju thought of as the most sacred and perhaps elite). This practice involved offering an elderly woman poisoned hungry rice (called 'Kasap') to end her suffering of physical infirmity. It was usually done by one of her children or her sister.

- Nkut (witchcraft): This is the power to exert spiritual influence over another person. People who use Nkut are referred to as 'Akut', and are believed to have a second set of eyes. The first set allows one to see the physical, while the other is used to see into the spiritual realm.
- Gajimale (water spirit): A gajimale comes out of rivers, or streams to seduce its victims by transforming into a good looking opposite sex of the victim. It was a belief that many rich people got their wealth from Gajimale, and in return, they gave children to it. Epilepsy (known as rong ncen meaning "fire of the river") was believed to be caused by the Gajimale.
- A̠bvoi (or Abvwoi): The Bajju had a religious institution called the Abvoi. The leader of the Abvoi shrine was called the 'Gado Abvoi' or 'Dodo'. The 'Magajin Abvoi' is the one who translates the messages of Abvoi to the people. The celebrations involved masquerade dances.
- Masquerades (Abusak): They represented the spirits in Abvoi celebrations. The Abusak danced with women and disciplines them by beating them.

=== Taboos and superstitions ===
Children were not to eat eggs and meat offered to them at other households, for it may be Nkut meat neither were they to go out in the heat of the midday sun, they may accept food from Akut.

Women:

- Were not to eat eggs, for they would be 'eating' their own children;
- Were not allowed to eat chicken and birds in general;
- Were not to cook or carry out farm activities for 7 days following child birth;
- Were not allowed to hit the wall with their hands or feet, for they would be calling the Abvoi;
- Were not allowed to hit people with brooms, especially men, for they would be 'sweeping away' all of his charms and power (including the power to impregnate a woman);
- Pregnant women were not to eat sugarcane; for their babies would grow too fat;
- Women were not to eat animal heads.

Men:

- Were not to allow their hair shaved halfway, for a spirit would come to finish the job, and cause the man to go mad;
- Were not to eat food prepared by menstruating women, for they would be exposed to blindness or bad luck in hunting;
- Were not to share secrets of the ancestor cult with women.

=== General taboos ===
- 'Spirit snakes' should not be killed. It may be the spirit of a person sleeping or having a fever;
- Do not whistle at night; for it would call a spirit;
- Do not whistle in the house of a hunter; for his charms would stop working;
- Do not blow food to cool it;
- A visitor must not eat food alone. A person from the visited household must eat with the guest to prove the food is not poisoned;
- People were not to talk while eating. Even though a stranger came in, they should not greet until they finished eating;
- One should not answer a call at night; for the person might die;
- One should not step over arrows;
- A cock that crows between dusk and midnight must be killed; for it calls the spirits.

=== Rules ===
- Men are buried facing east (direction of Ba̠jju origin) while women were buried facing west.
- Those who died as a result of falling off a tree, falling off the roof of a house, or shot during hunting, were buried where the incident took place, and do not receive a burial ceremony.
- Women who died during child birth were buried at the backyard of their home.
- Someone with small pox was isolated because they believed he was a wizard. They are not given a burial ceremony after dying.
- Before drinking, elders were to pour a few drops on the ground for the ancestors.
- The Ba̠jju believed in reincarnation.
- The Ba̠jju believed that when a shooting star passes across the sky, a great man has died somewhere and is going to land somewhere else for reincarnation.

=== Taking oaths ===
Men could swear the following oaths:

- Sshi a̱nok: To swear on one's hoe. The oath was 'If I did this, may the hoe cut my leg'.
- Sshi ka̱ta: To swear on one's bow.
- Sswa mbyin: To swear on a drum. A drum was kept with each village's gado (village head) and was used for matters affecting the entire village and used to settle local disputes.

Women could swear the following oaths:

- Sshi a̱byai: To swear on one's headboard (the item used to rest loads atop women's heads). If her oath was false, her child birth would not be a safe delivery.
- Sswa a̱bubvo: To swear on one's skin. The skin is the piece of clothing used to secure a child on her back. If the oath was false, the child in the skin would die.
- Sswa ka̱tssong: To swear on one's axe. 'May her axe cut her if her oath is false'.

=== Life after death ===
Ba̠jju people like any other tribe in African believe in life after death in the sense that they acknowledge that ancestors performs some function to enable human happiness and prosperity. Their will is sought for at any time and for every purpose in life. People who seek to be in good terms with the ancestors show them respect in their families. It is also believed that the elder must eat first before any other person, and when drinking, they have to pour some drops on the ground for the ancestors to take.

== Language ==
The Bajju people, speak the Jju language, which is one of the Central Plateau languages, and seems to be a variant of Tyap, alongside Gworok, Fantswam, Takad, Tyuku, Tyap proper, Sholyio and Tyeca̠rak; whose speakers are ethnically distinct.

== Politics ==
The Bajju people are governed by a traditional leader appointed by the Kaduna State government who governs the affairs of the people, whose headquarters is at Zonkwa (or Azunkwa).

The Bajju paramount leader is called A̠gwam Ba̠jju. The first monarch was late His Royal Highness, Agwam Bajju I, and the current one is His Highness Luka Kogi Yabwat.

== Notable people ==
- Katung Aduwak: Winner of Big Brother Nigeria (Season 1, 2006).
- Rachel Bakam: A Nigerian entertainer.
- Maj. Gen. Ishaya Bakut: military governor Benue State (1986-1987); businessman who became vice-chairman of Anjeed Innova Group (2013-2015).
- Barr. (Col.) Yohanna A. Madaki: Military governor of defunct Gongola State, Nigeria (1985-1986); military governor of Benue State (August 1986 –September 1986).
- Sunday Marshall Katung, former member of the Nigerian House of Representatives, representinɡ Jaba/Zanɡon-Kataf federal constituency, and runninɡ mate to the People's Democratic Party candidate in the 2019 Governorship elections of Kaduna State, Nigeria; Senator representing Kaduna South Senatorial Zone (2023-date)
- Engr. Stephen Rijo Shekari: deputy governor of Kaduna State (1999-2005).
