= Central Plateau languages =

Plateau language branch of Nigeria

Central Plateau
- Geographic distribution: Nigeria
- Linguistic classification: Niger–Congo?: Atlantic–Congo; Benue–Congo; Plateau; Central Plateau
- Subdivisions: Rigwe; Izere; Tyapic; Hyamic; Koro; Gyongic; Yeskwa; North Plateau

Language codes
- Glottolog: None sout3163 (Irigwe–Izeric–Tyapic) nort3184 (Hyamic–Koroic–Gyongic) nort3169 (North Plateau)

The twenty Central Plateau languages are a residual branch of the Plateau family spoken in central Nigeria. Tyap (or Katab) has over 200,000 speakers, and the closely related Jju (or Kaje) has well over 300,000. Hyam (or Jabba) has another 100,000. Cori is famous for being one of very few languages with six tone levels, though only three are needed for writing.

== Classification ==
The Central Plateau languages are a close geographical group with numerous connections; however, they are to some extent a residual group and may be a sprachbund. The following classification is taken from Blench (2008). A distinction between North Plateau and the rest of Central Plateau is possible but appears to be geographic; Gerhardt (1994) argues they belong together.

Each of the second-level bullets is a single language or dialect cluster and is obviously valid. However, most of the first-level groups (Hyamic, North Plateau, Gyongic, Koro) are not self-evident and may continue to be revised.

- Rigwe (Irigwe)
- Izeric
  - Izere: NE & NW Izere, Cèn, Ganàng
  - Fəràn (Firan) – clearly related to Izere
- Tyapic
  - Tyap (Katab): Tyap proper, Gworok, Takat (Attakar), Tyecha̱rak (Kacecere), Sholyia̱ (Sholio), Fantswam (Kafanchan), Tyuku
  - Jju (Kaje)
- Hyamic
  - Cori (Kyoli)
  - Yat (Dangana)
  - Hyam (Jabba): Hyam of Nok, Sait, Dzar; maybe Yat (Yaat), Ankun also separate
  - Shamang
  - Zhire (Shang is relexified Zhire)
- Koro
  - Koro: Ashe, Begbere-Ejar
  - Yeskwa (Nyankpa)
  - Idun, Gwara
- Gyongic
  - Gyong (Kagoma)
  - Nghan (Kamantan)
- North Plateau (Northwest)
  - Adara (Eda, Edra)
  - Kuturmi
  - Kulu (Ikulu)
  - Idon
  - Doka
  - Iku (Iku-Gora-Ankwe)

Blench (2018) splits the Central Plateau languages into a Northwest Plateau group consisting of Eda/Edra, Acro-Obiro (Kuturmi), Kulu, Idon, Doka, Iku-Gora-Ankwe, and a West-Central Plateau linguistic area consisting of the Rigwe, Tyapic, Izeric, Hyamic, Koro, and Gyongic groups.

Many of the languages, including Jju, were formerly classified as part of a Southern Zaria group in earlier classifications.

== Names and locations ==
Below is a list of language names, populations, and locations from Blench (2019).

	Language	Branch	Cluster	Dialects	Alternate spellings	Own name for language	Endonym(s)	Other names (location-based)	Other names for language	Exonym(s)	Speakers	Location(s)	Notes
Izere cluster	Central	Izere		Izarek, Zarek		Afizere: other spellings – Fizere, Feserek, Afizarek, Afusare, Fezere		Jarawa	Jarawan Dutse	22,000 (LA 1971); 30,000 (1977 Voegelin & Voegelin)	Bauchi State, Toro LGA; Plateau State, Jos South and Barkin Ladi LGAs; Kaduna State, Jema’a LGA probably migrants only		
Fobur	Central	Izere	Fobur, Shere, Jos Zarazon	Fobor					Northwestern Jarawa	Fewer than 15,000 (1991)	Bauchi State, Toro LGA; Plateau State, Jos LGA		
Northeastern Izere	Central	Izere	Federe=Fedare, Zendi, Fursum, Jarawan Kogi								Bauchi State, Toro LGA; Plateau State, Jos LGA		
Southern Izere	Central	Izere		Forom						Fewer than 4,000 (1991)	Plateau State, Barkin Ladi LGA at Forom and Gashish villages		
Ichèn	Central	Izere											
Faishang	Central	Izere											
Ganang	Central	Izere											
Jju	Central				Kәjju	Baju, Bajju		Kaje, Kajji, Kache		26,600 (NAT 1949); possibly 200,000 (1984 SIL)	Kaduna State, Zangon Kataf, Kachia and Jema’a LGAs		
Tyap cluster	Central	Tyap		Kataf							Kaduna State, Zangon Kataf, Kaura and Jema’a LGAs		
Tyap	Central	Tyap		Atyab, Tyab	Tyap	Atyap, Atyab	Katab, Kataf, Katap			estimate more than 130,000 (1990)	Kaduna State, Zangon Kataf and Kaura LGAs		
Gworok	Central	Tyap			Agwolok, Agwot, Gworog		Agolok, Kagoro	Aguro		9,300 (NAT 1949)	Kaduna State, Kaura LGA		
Takad	Central	Tyap		Atakat, Attaka, Attakar, Atakar, Takat						5,000 (1950 HDG)	Kaduna State, Kaura LGA	no data	
Sholio	Central	Tyap				Asholio, Asolio, Osholio, Aholio		Marwa, Morwa, Moroa, Marawa, Maroa		5,700 (NAT 1949)	Kaduna State, Kaura LGA, around Manchok town	no data	
Tyecarak	Central	Tyap		Aticherak, Kacicere				Daroro		700 (NAT 1949)	Kaduna State, Zangon Kataf and Kaura LGAs	no data	
Fantswam	Central	Tyap		Fantuan, Kafanchan, Kpashan						970, (1934 HDG)	Kaduna State, Jema’a LGA	no data	
Fɨran	Central, South-Central			Faran, Forom	Fɨràn	yes Fɨràn sg. yes Bèfɨràn pl.	Kwakwi			Fewer than 1500 (1991)	Plateau State, Barakin Ladi LGA, at Kwakwi station, south of Jos		
Rigwe	Central, South-Central		Northern (Kwall), Southern (Miango)	Aregwe, Irigwe	ɾȉgʷȅ, Rigwe	ƴîɾìgʷȅ pl. yíɾìgʷȅ	Miango, Nyango, Kwall, Kwoll, Kwan			13,500 (HDG); 40,000 (1985 UBS)	Bassa local government, Plateau State and Kauru local government, Kaduna State		
Cori	Hyamic			Chori						A single village and associated hamlets	Kaduna State, Jema’a LGA		
Hyam cluster	Hyamic	Hyam	Kwak (=Nkwak) appears as a Hyamic language in Ethnologue (2009) and earlier versions, but the name is spurious and is simply a Hyam town name	Ham, Hum	Jaba					43,000	Kaduna State, Kachia and Jema’a LGAs		
Kwyeny	Hyamic	Hyam											
Yaat	Hyamic	Hyam											
Saik	Hyamic	Hyam											
Dzar	Hyamic	Hyam											
Hyam of Nok	Hyamic	Hyam											
Shamang	Hyamic			Samban	Shamang	Samang					Kaduna State, Kachia and Jema’a LGAs		
Shang	Hyamic			Kushampa	u-ʃaŋ pl. aʃaŋ	ʃaŋ					Kaduna State, Kachia and Jema’a LGAs. The Shang live in two settlements, Kushampa A and B. Kushampa A is on the road between Kurmin Jibrin and Kubacha on the Jere road.		
Zhire	Hyamic							Kenyi			Kaduna State, Kachia and Jema’a LGAs	no data	
Ashe	Koro			Ache	únɛ́r ìzɛ̀ sg. Bɛ̀zɛ̀ pl.	Ìzɛ̀	The Ashe share a common ethnonym with the Tinɔr-Myamya (q.v.) which is Uzar pl. Bazar for the people and Ìzar for the language. This name is the origin of the term Ejar.		Koron Ache	35,000 including Tinɔr-Myamya (Barrett 1972). 8 villages (2008) between Katugal and Kubacha.	Kaduna State, Kagarko LGA, Nasarawa State, Karu LGA		
Tinɔr-Myamya cluster	Koro	Tinɔr-Myamya		The Tinɔr-Myamya peoples actually have no common name for themselves, but refer to individual villages when speaking, and apply noun-class prefixes to the stem.			Begbere-Ejar. The Tinɔr-Myamya share a common ethnonym with the Ashe (q.v.) which is Uzar pl. Bazar for the people and Ìzar for the language. This name is the origin of the term Ejar.		Koro Agwe, Agwere, Koro Makama	35,000 including Ashe (1972 Barrett)	Kaduna State, Kagarko LGA	The name Begbere comes from Bàgbwee, a Myamya village, and Ejar from Ìzar (see 2.A). There has been a recent proposal to adopt the name DAWN for Koro as a whole.	
Tinor	Koro	Tinɔr-Myamya		Waci	iTinɔr	uTinɔr pl. baTinɔr			Waci [widely adopted name], Ala, Koron Ala, Koro Makama	Seven villages south and west of Kubacha. Uca, Unɛr, Ùsám, Marke, Pànkòrè, Ùtúr, Gɛshɛberẽ			
Myamya	Koro	Tinɔr-Myamya							Koro Myamya = Miamia = Miyamiya	Three villages north and west of Kubacha. Ùshɛ̀, Bàgàr [includes Kúràtǎm, Ùcɛr and Bɔ̀dṹ] and Bàgbwee.			
Nyankpa	Koro		Mbgwende=Ambofa [Bade dialect], Ambo Tem [Panda, Tattara, Buzi]. Tattara is said to be the ‘standard’ form of Yeskwa.		Nnaŋkpa pl. Anaŋkpa	Nyankpa	Yasgua, Yeskwa	Sarogbon [a greeting]		13,000 (1973 SIL)	Nasarawa State, Kauru LGA; Kaduna State, Jema’a LGA		
Gwara	Koro	Idun			iGwara	uŋGwara sg. aGwara pl.			Gora	Five villages [2012]	Kaduna State, Kagarko, Jaba LGAs		
Idun	Koro	Nyankpa-Idun			Idṹ	Udṹ sg. Adun, Adṹ pl.	Dũya [‘language of home’]	Adong	Jaba Lungu, Ungu, Jaba Gengere [‘Jaba of the slopes’]	1,500 (NAT 1949). 21 villages [2008]	Kaduna State, Jema’a, Jaba LGAs; Nasarawa State, Karu LGA		
Gyong	Gyongic			Agoma, Kagoma	Gyong	Gong		Gwong, Gyong		6,250 (1934 HDG)	Kaduna State, Jema’a LGA		
Kamantan	Gyongic			Kamanton = Kamantan		Angan				3,600 (NAT 1949); 10,000 (1972 Barrett)	Kaduna State, Kachia LGA		
Ekhwa	Northern		[Iku status uncertain], Gora, Ankwa	[Iku]–Gora–Ankwa	ékhwá	sg. énéjì pl. ánárè	Ahua		Ehwa	Towns; Gora, Ankwa	Kaduna State, Kachia LGA		
Kadara cluster	Northern	Kadara											
Eda	Northern	Kadara		Adara	Ànda pl. Àda	Èdà	Kadara			22,000 (NAT 1949); 40,000 (1972 Barrett). Towns: Adunu, Amale, Dakalo, Ishau, Kurmin Iya, Kateri, Bishini, Doka (Kaduna road)	Kaduna State, Kachia LGA; Niger State, Paikoro LGA		
Edra	Northern	Kadara			Àndara pl. Àdara	Èdrà	Kadara			Towns; Maru, Kufana, Rimau, Kasuwan Magani, Iri	Kaduna State, Kachia, Kajuru LGAs		
Enezhe	Northern	Kadara			Àndara pl. Àdara	Èdrà	Kadara			Towns; Maru, Kufana, Rimau, Kasuwan Magani, Iri	Kaduna State, Kachia, Kajuru LGAs		
Kulu	Northwestern			Ikolu, Ikulu	Ankulu	Bekulu				6,000 (NAT 1949)	Kaduna State, Kachia LGA		
Ikryo	Northwestern				sg. à-kró pl. ā-kró	ìkryó		West Kuturmi		Two villages	Kaduna State, Kachia LGA		
Obiro	Northwestern				sg. óbìrò pl. òbírò	ìbìrò		West Kuturmi		Antara village	Kaduna State, Kachia LGA		
Ajiya	Northwestern			Ajuli	Ajiya	Ajiya	Idon, Idong, Idon-Doka-Makyali			3 towns	Kaduna State, Kachia LGA		
Ajuwa-Ajegha	Northwestern				Ajuwa	Ajuwa				Towns; Kalla, Afogo, Iburu, Idon, Makyali	Kaduna State, Kajuru LGA		
