= Nyankpa language =

Plateau language of Nigeria

Nyankpa
- Yeskwa
- nyankpá
- Native to: Nigeria
- Region: Kaduna State, Nassarawa State
- Native speakers: 70,000 (2012)
- Language family: Niger–Congo?: Atlantic–Congo; Benue–Congo; Plateau; Central ?; Koroic; Nyankpa

Language codes
- ISO 639-3: yes
- Glottolog: yesk1239

Nyankpa
- Person: òŋamkpa
- People: àŋamkpa
- Language: nyankpá

Nyankpa or Yeskwa (nyankpá) is a Nasarawa and Kaduna Language of Nigeria. It sometimes appears in the literature as Nyenkpa, which is a dialect.

== Dialects ==
The main dialects are Panda, Tattara, Bede and Gitata (Buzi). The prestige dialect is Tattara, which is said to be the standard form of the language.
