= Kulu language =

Plateau language spoken in Nigeria

Kulu
- Ikulu
- Native to: Nigeria
- Region: Kaduna State
- Native speakers: (50,000 cited 1998)
- Language family: Niger–Congo?: Atlantic–Congo; Benue–Congo; Plateau; Central ?; North Plateau ?; Kulu

Language codes
- ISO 639-3: ikl
- Glottolog: ikul1238

Kulu
- Person: Ankulu
- People: Bakulu
- Language: Ikulu
- Country: Akulu

The Kulu language (Ikulu) also known as Ankulu or Ikolu, is a Plateau language of Nigeria. It is spoken by the Bakulu, found in the Zangon Kataf, Kachia and Kauru Local Government Areas of Kaduna State.
