= Adara language =

Plateau language spoken in Nigeria

Adara
- Eda
- Native to: Nigeria
- Region: Kaduna State; Niger State
- Native speakers: 300,000 (2011)
- Language family: Niger–Congo?: Atlantic–Congo; Benue–Congo; Plateau; Central ?; North Plateau ?; Adara

Language codes
- ISO 639-3: kad
- Glottolog: kada1284

- Person: Àndara
- People: Àdara
- Language: Èdrà

- Person: Ànda
- People: Àda
- Language: Èdà

Adara (also Eda and Kadara), is a Central Plateau language spoken by Adara people of Kaduna State and Niger State of Nigeria. The name Adara is also used to refer to the ethnic group.

Some estimates place the population of the Adara people at around 500,000. About 80% of the Adara are Christians, while some also adhere to Islam.

== Distribution ==
Adara is spoken mainly in Kachia and Kajuru Local Government Areas as well as parts of Chikun and Kagarko of Kaduna State. In the Paikoro and Munya local government areas of Niger State in the Middle Belt region of Nigeria.

== Dialects ==
Dialects of the Adara language include the Adara dialect, Eneje, Ada, Ekhwa, and Ajiya.

Blench (2019) lists Eda, Edra, and Enezhe as dialects.

== Phonology ==
=== Consonants ===
	Bilabial	Labiodental	Alveolar	Alveo-palatal	Palatal	Velar	Labial–velar	Glottal
Plosive	p b		t d		[c] ɟ	k g	kp gb	
Nasal	m		n			ŋ		
Tap			ɾ					
Fricative		f v	s z	ʃ ʒ		[ɣ]		h
Affricate		[bv]						
Approximant					j <y>		w	
Lateral			l					

=== Vowels ===
	Front	Central	Back
Close	i		u
Close-mid	e		o
Open-mid	ɛ		ɔ
Open		a	
