= Rigwe language =

Plateau language of Nigeria

Rigwe
- Nkarigwe
- Native to: Nigeria
- Region: Plateau State, Kaduna State
- Native speakers: (40,000 cited 1985)
- Language family: Niger–Congo?: Atlantic–Congo; Benue–Congo; Plateau; Central ?; Rigwe

Language codes
- ISO 639-3: iri
- Glottolog: irig1241

Rigwe
- People: Nneirigwe
- Language: Nkarigwe

ɾȉgʷȅ
- Person: ƴîɾìgʷȅ
- People: yíɾìgʷȅ
- Language: ɾȉgʷȅ

The Rigwe language, Nkarigwe, is a Plateau language of Nigeria spoken by the Irigwe people mainly found in Bassa Local Government Area of Plateau State.

Rigwe has highly complex phonology. The presence of the lateral fricative /ɬ/ in Rigwe, unusual among Plateau languages, suggests that there used to be West Chadic languages in the area with this phoneme.

== Phonology ==
Rigwe phonology:

Rigwe Consonants
		Bilabial			Labiodental		Dental		Alveolar			Palato-alveolar		(Alveolo-)Palatal				Velar			Labial–velar/ Glottal		
		plain	pl.	lb.	plain	pal.	plain	pl.	plain	pl.	lb.	plain	lb.	plain	pl.	lb.	glo.	plain	lb.	glo.	plain	pal	glo.
Nasal	voiced	m	mʲ	mʷ	ɱ				n					ɲ, ɲː		ɲʷ		ŋ	ŋʷ, ŋʷʲ		ŋ͡m		
Stop	voiceless	p	pʲ						t					c	cʲ	cʷ	ˀc	k	kʷ	ˀk	k͡p		ˀkp
Stop	voiced	b, ˀb	bʲ						d					ɟ	ɟʲ	ɟʷ		ɡ	ɡʷ	ˀɡʷ	ɡ͡b		ˀɡb
Fricative	voiceless				f	fʲ			s, ˀs			ʃ	ʃʷ, ˀʃʷ								h	hʲ	
Fricative	voiced				v	vʲ	ð	ðʲ	z			ʒ	ʒʷ										
Affricate	voiceless	ps							ts	tsʲ		t̠ʃ	t̠ʃʷ	tɕ	tɕʷ								
Affricate	voiced											d̠ʒ	d̠ʒʷ										
Approximant	voiceless								ɬ							j̊ʷ					w		
Approximant	voiced								l					j		jʷ	ˀj				ʍ	ʍʲ	ˀʍ, ˀʍʲ
Tap									ɾ	ɾʲ	ɾʷ												
Trill		ʙ							r	rʲ	rʷ												

Rigwe Vowels
	Front		Central		Back	
	Oral	Nasal	Oral	Nasal	Oral	Nasal
Close	i	ĩ			u	ũ
Close-mid	e	ẽ			o	õ
Open	ɛ	ɛ̃	a	ã	ɔ	ɔ̃

Rigwe Tones
	Toneme
High	˦
Mid	˧
Mid-low	˨
Low	˩
