= Idun language =

Plateau language spoken in Nigeria

Idun
- Dũya
- Idṹ
- Native to: Nigeria
- Region: Kaduna State
- Native speakers: 78,000 (2012)
- Language family: Niger–Congo?: Atlantic–Congo; Benue–Congo; Plateau; Central ?; Koroic; Idun

Language codes
- ISO 639-3: ldb
- Glottolog: idun1241

Dṹ
- Person: Udṹ
- People: Adṹ
- Language: Idṹ

Idun (Idũ) or Dũya (Dunya, Adong, Lungu, Ungu), is a poorly attested Plateau language of Nigeria. Its classification is uncertain, but it may be closest to Ashe.

== Villages ==
Speakers live in Ramindop B, Ùndofã̀, Udou, Táymɛ̀̃, Adar, Igbà, Mɛ̀mdɔr, Hùrtɔ̀̃, Àgbàŋànɔr, Ùmbùmbàŋ, Jàja, Ǹdam, Kùkaŋ, Ùkare, Ùnwĩĩ, Igbayinɔr, Ìdɛ̀zìnì, and Ugɛrɛ villages of Kaduna State. Hausa village names are Shinkafa, Yèlwa, Jabe Panda, and Gunduma.

== Phonology ==
=== Consonants ===
	Bilabial	Labiodental	Alveolar	Post-alveolar	Retroflex	Palatal	Labial-palatal	Velar	Labial-velar	Glottal
Stop	p b		t d			c ɟ		k ɡ	k͡p ɡ͡b	
Nasal	m		n					ŋ		
Tap			ɾ		ɽ					
Trill			r							
Fricative		f v	s z	ʃ ʒ				x ɣ		h
Affricate	p̪͡f b̪͡v		t͡s d͡z							
Approximant						j	ɥ		w	
Lateral			(l)^{1}							

1. Only in recent loanwords, mostly from Hausa

=== Vowels ===
	Front	Central	Back
Close	i		u
Near-Close	ɪ		ʊ
Close-Mid	e		o
Open-Mid	ɛ		ɔ
Open		a	

All vowels except the near-close vowels /ɪ/ and /ʊ/ can appear long, nasalised or both; the vowels /ɪ/ and /ʊ/ are being lost for young speakers.

=== Tone ===
There are three level tones in Idun, as well as a rising tone and falling tone arising from adjacent level tones.
