= Kachia =

Kachia Akhwee
- Town and LGA
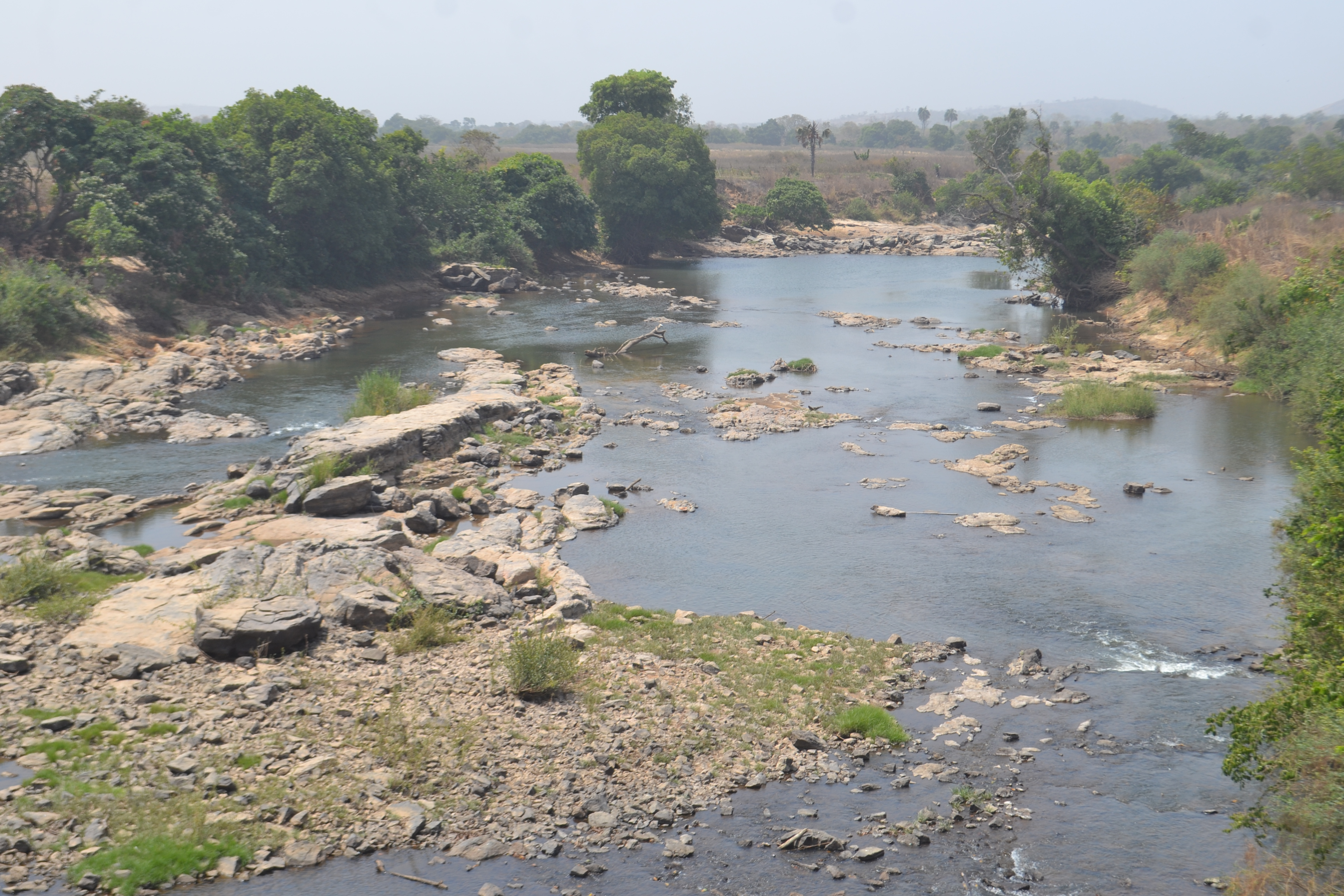
- Gurara River
- Motto: Home of Ginger
- Interactive map of Kachia
- Location within Nigeria
- Coordinates: 09°52′24″N 07°57′15″E
- Country: Nigeria
- State: Kaduna State

Government
  - Type: Democracy
  - Executive Chairman: Hon. Aaron Bako

Area
  - Total: 4,570 km^{2} (1,760 sq mi)

Population (2006 Census)
  - Total: 252,568
  - Density: 74.6/km^{2} (193/sq mi)
- Time zone: UTC+01:00 (WAT)
- Postal code: 802
- ISO 3166 code: NG.KD.KC
- Climate: Aw
- Website: www.KEDA.com

Kachia (Adara: Akhwee) is a town and local government area in the southern part of Kaduna State, Nigeria. It has an area of 4,570 km^{2} and a population of 252,568 in the 2006 census. The postal code of the area is 802.

== Boundaries ==
The Kachia Local Government Area (LGA) shares boundaries with the Zangon Kataf LGA to the east, the Kajuru LGA to the northeast, the Kagarko LGA to the south, the Jaba LGA to the southeast, the Chikun LGA to the northwest; and Munya and Paikoro LGAs of Niger State to west, respectively.

== Administrative subdivisions ==
The Kachia Local Government Area consists of 12 subdivisions (second-order administrative divisions) or electoral wards, namely:

1. Agunu
2. Ankwa
3. Awon
4. Bishini
5. Dokwa
6. Gidan Tagwai
7. Gumel
8. Kachia (Akhwee)
9. Kateri (Anumafa)
10. Kurmin Musa
11. Kwaturu
12. Sabon Sarki (Ghiing)

== Population ==
According to the March 21, 2006 national population census, the Kachia Local Government Area's population was put at 252,568. Its population was projected by the National Population Commission of Nigeria and National Bureau of Statistics to be 340,900 by March 21, 2016.

== Climate ==
Temperatures range from 58 °F to 96 °F throughout the year, with sporadic dips below or above 101 °F, during warm and partly cloudy wet seasons.

=== Average Temperature ===
With an average daily high temperature of 92 °F, the hot season spans 2.4 months, from February 2 to April 16. At an average high temperature of 96 °F and low temperature of 68 °F, March is the hottest month in Kachia. With an average daily maximum temperature below 82 °F, the chilly season spans 3.4 months, from June 23 to October 3. December is the coldest month in Kachia, with an average low temperature of 58 °F and high temperature of 87 °F.

== People ==
Most of the people of Kachia include the Adara, Tinor-Myamya, Gbagyi, Ham. Others include the Bajju, Bakulu, and the Hausa.

== Economy ==
Ginger has become a major economic crop of the Kachia Local Government Area due to the high yield of the root crop in the land. Other agro-products include corn, sorghum, millet and soybeans. In 2023, an outbreak of a fungal disease destroyed much of the ginger crop in Kachia and neighbouring local government areas of southern Kaduna State, with about 95 per cent of the ginger grown in the state that year reported lost.

Kachia town is also one of the largest towns in southern Kaduna state where various small and medium scale businesses contribute to the economy of the state and country at large.

== Religion ==
Christianity has the largest number of adherents in the Kachia Local Government Area. Islam is also practiced, while the African Traditional religion has an ever increasing number of adherents.

== Education ==
=== Tertiary institutions ===
- Federal University of Applied Sciences Kachia (formerly Nok University Kachia)

== Notable people ==
- Martin Luther Agwai, military personnel
- Yohanna Kure, military personnel
