= Plateau languages =

Group of Benue–Congo languages of central Nigeria

Plateau
- Platoid
- Geographic distribution: Plateau, Kaduna, and Nasarawa states, Nigeria
- Linguistic classification: Niger–Congo?: Atlantic–Congo; Volta-Congo; Benue–Congo; Central Nigerian; Plateau

Language codes
- Glottolog: benu1248
- The Plateau languages shown within Nigeria

The Plateau languages are a tentative group of forty or so Benue–Congo languages spoken by 15 million people on the Jos Plateau, Southern Kaduna, Nasarawa State and in adjacent areas in central Nigeria.

Berom and Eggon have the most speakers. Most Plateau languages are threatened and have around 2,000-10,000 speakers.

Defining features of the Plateau family have only been published in manuscript form (Blench 2008). Many of the languages have highly elaborate phonology systems that make comparison with poor data difficult.

== Branches and locations ==
Below is a list of major Plateau branches and their primary locations (centres of diversity) based on Blench (2019).

Distributions of Plateau branches
Branch	Primary locations
Alumic	Akwanga LGA, Nasarawa State
Beromic	Barkin Ladi, Jos North, Jos South and Riyom LGAs, Plateau State; and Jema'a LGAs, Kaduna State
Central	Jaba, Jema'a, Kachia, Kagarko, Kajuru, Kaura, Kauru and Zangon Kataf LGAs, Kaduna State; and Bassa, Jos East and Jos North LGAs, Plateau State; Toro and Tafawa Balewa LGAs, Bauchi State
East	Mangu LGA, Plateau State
Ndunic	Sanga LGA, Kaduna State
Ninzic	Jema'a and Sanga LGAs, Kaduna State; and Akwanga LGA, Nasarawa State
South	Akwanga, Nasarawa Eggon, Lafia LGAs, Nasarawa State; Bwari LGA, Federal Capital Territory
Tarokoid	Langtang North, Langtang South, Wase LGAs, Plateau State

The Plateau languages are highly typologically and lexically diverse. For instance, Roger Blench (2022) notes that Beromic is more internally diverse than all of West Chadic A3.

== Classification ==
Little work has been done on the Plateau languages, and the results to date are tentative.

=== Blench (2018) ===
Blench (2018:112) gives the following classification of the Plateau languages.

- Plateau
  - Tarokoid (5)
  - South
    - Eggonic (2)
    - Jilic (2–4)
  - ? East (2–3)
    - Bo-Rukul
    - Horom-Fyem
  - Ndunic (Ahwai) (1–3)
  - Alumic (4)
  - Ninzic (13–14)
  - ? West-Central area (~20)
    - Rigwe
    - Tyapic
    - Izeric
    - Hyamic
    - Koro
    - Gyongic
  - North-West
  - Beromic (4)
  - ? Eloyi

=== Blench (2008) ===
The following classification is taken from Blench (2008). Most of the branches are discrete constituents, though Central is a residual grouping and there are doubts about some of the purported Ninzic languages. Plateau languages as a whole share a number of isoglosses, as do all branches apart from Tarokoid.

- Plateau
  - Tarokoid (5)
    - Eloyi
    - South
      - Eggonic (2)
      - Jilic (2–4)
    - Ndunic (Ahwai) (1–3)
    - Alumic (4)
    - Ninzic (13–14)
    - ? East (2–3)
    - ? Central (20)
    - Beromic (4)

Glottolog adds the Yukubenic languages. Blench, however, places Yukubenic in the Jukunoid family, following Shimizu (1980).

=== Gerhardt (1983) ===
Classification of Plateau languages by Gerhardt (1983), based on Maddieson (1972):

- Plateau
  - Plateau 1a, 1b (Kainji languages)
  - Plateau 2
    - Yeskwa, Lungu, Koro
    - Kamanton, Kagoma, Jaba cluster, Nandu-Tari
    - Afuzare, Kaje, Iregwe
    - Kagoro, Ataka, Katab (including Kachicheri, Kafanchan), Marwa
    - Kadara, Kuturmi, Ikulu, Idong, Doka, Iku-Gora-Ankwa
  - Plateau 3
    - Migili (?, L. G.)
    - Birom (including Aboro, Afango)
    - Aten
  - Plateau 4
    - Ayu
    - Kwanka-Boi-Bijim-Shall-Zwall
    - Ninzam, Mada, Gwantu, Numana-Nunku, Nindem, Kaningkon, Kanufi
    - Rukuba
  - Plateau 5
    - Yashi
    - Eggon, Nungu, Ake, Jidda-Abu
  - Plateau 6
    - Pyam
    - Horom
  - Plateau 7
    - Tarok (= Yergam)
    - Bashar
    - Pai
  - Plateau 8
    - Mabo-Barkul
  - Plateau 9
    - Eloyi
  - Plateau 10
    - Turkwam, Arum-Chesu

Note: Plateau 1 languages, consisting of Plateau 1a and 1b, are now classified separately as Kainji languages.

== Language list ==
List of Plateau languages given by Blench (2018):

- Plateau
  - Northwest
    - Eda
    - Edra
    - Acro
    - Obiro
    - Mwaghavul
    - Ẹjẹgha (Idon)
    - Doka
    - Ẹhwa (Iku-Gora-Ankwe)
  - Beromic
    - Berom
    - Buji
    - Cara
    - Iten
    - Shall-Zwall
  - West-Central (area)
    - Izeric
      - Izere of Fobur
      - Icèn, Ganàng, Fəràn
    - Rigwe
    - Southern Zaria (now Southern Kaduna)
    - Tyapic
      - Jju
      - Tyap
      - Gworok
      - Takad (Attakar)
      - Tyecarak (Kacicere)
      - Sholyio
      - Fantswam (Kafancan)
      - Tyuku
    - Koro
      - Ashe
      - Tinɔr (Waci-Myamya)
      - Idũ, Gwara
      - Nyankpa-Barde
    - Hyamic
      - Shamang
      - Cori
      - Hyam
      - Zhire
      - Shang
    - Gyongic
      - Gyong (Kagoma)
      - Nɡhan (Kamanton)
  - Ninzic
    - Ninzo
    - Ce
    - Bu-Niŋkada
    - Mada
    - Numana-Nunku-Gwantu-Numbu
    - Ningye-Ninka
    - Anib
    - Ninkyob
    - Nindem
    - Nungu
    - Ayu
  - Ndunic
    - Ndun (Tari)
  - Alumic
    - Toro, Alumu-Təsu
    - Hasha
    - Sambe
  - Southern
    - Eggonic
      - Eggon
      - Ake
    - Jilic
      - Jili
      - Jijili
  - Southeastern (?)
    - Fyem
    - Horom
    - Bo-Rukul
  - Tarokoid
    - Tarok
    - Pe (Pai)
    - Kwang-Ya-Bijim-Legeri
    - Yaŋkam (Bashar)
    - Sur (Tapshin)
  - Eloyi

Nisam is a presumed Plateau language once spoken in Nince Village, Kaduna State, but its place within the Plateau branch cannot be ascertained due to the lack of linguistic data. In 2005, there was only one speaker of Nisam.

== Morphology ==
Proto-Plateau nominal prefixes:

- *ni- (corresponding to Bantu noun class 9 *n- for animals and inanimate objects)
- *V- for person, *bV- for people
- *N- prefixes, homorganic with the following consonant
- *nV- ~ *mV- (both singular and plural), which mark liquids, mass nouns, and abstract nouns

Only some of the languages have nominal classes, as the Bantu languages have, where in others these have eroded. In many Plateau languages, many CV- prefixes have become fossilised, replaced by V- prefixes, or disappeared altogether. The large numbers of consonants in many languages is due to the erosion of noun-class prefixes.

In Plateau languages, adjectives and possessive forms generally follow the noun.

== Reconstructions ==
Some Proto-Plateau quasi-reconstructions proposed by Roger Blench (2008) are:

No.	Gloss	Proto-Plateau
1.	tree	#ku-kon V-kon
2.	leaf	#(g)yaNa
4.	dew	#-myeŋe
12.	wind	#-gbulu
21.	hunger	#igbyoŋ
25.	ear	#ku-toŋ(ɔ)
26.	mouth	#ku-nyu
30.	female breast	#ambɛŋ
31.	navel	#i-kumbu
32.	bone	#-kupu
35.	blood	#-(n)ji
64.	twelve/ten	#isok-

== Numerals ==
Comparison of numerals in individual languages:

Classification	Language	1	2	3	4	5	6	7	8	9	10
South	Lijili	lō̥	àbē̥	àtʃé̥	ànàró̥	àsó̥	mìnzí	mútá	rúnó̥	zàtʃé̥	zàbè̥
Beromic	Aten (Iten)	dáy	fà	tàt / tʃàt	nàːs	wí	tàːrà	nìtà	nàràs	dùːdʒàŋ	dùːbɔ̀
Beromic	Berom (Birom)	ɡwīnìŋ / (d)īnìŋ (Roots)	-bā	-tāt	-nāːs	-tūŋūn	-tī̄ː mìn	-tāːmà (5+ 2)	-rwīːt (5+ 3)	syāː-tāt (12- 3)	syāː-tāt (12- 2)
Central, South-Central	Irigwe (Rigwe)	ˀzrú	ˀʍʲè	ˀt͡sʲɛ̀	ˀni	ˀt͡ɕʷòô	rít͡sʲɛ́	nat͡sʲɛ́	klaǹvà	kruvájá	ʃʷá
Central, South-Central	Jju (Kaje)	əyriŋ	əhwa	ətat	ənaai	əpfwɔn	əkitat (2 x 3)	ətiyriŋ	ənaimbvwak	əkumbvuyriŋ	swak
Central, South-Central	Tyap (Kataf)	əɲiuŋ/ ʒyiuŋ	əfeaŋ/ sweaŋ	ətat/ t͡sat	ənaai/ ɲaai	əfwuon/ t͡swuon	ətaa	ənatat	əninai/ ərinai	əkubunyiuŋ	swak
Northern	Ikulu (Kulu)	íńjí	íńpààlá	íńtáá	íńnāā	íńcūū	íńcúnú	tɔ́ɔ̀pāā	níǹnāā (2 x 4) ?	tɔ́ɔ̀llāā	nùkɔ̄p
Southeastern	Fyam (Pyem)	kʲéŋ	por	táár	naas	tóón	táárin	támor	tʃínít	téres	dukút
Tarokoid	Tarok (Yergam)	ùzɨ̀ŋ	ùpàrɨ́m	ùʃáɗɨ́ŋ	ùnèɗɨ́ŋ	ùtúkún	ùk͡pə́ɗɨ́ŋ	ùfàŋʃát	ùnə̀nnè	ùfàŋzɨ́ŋtɨ́ŋ	ùɡ͡bə́pei
Western, Northwestern, Hyamic	Hyam (Jabba)	ʒìnì	fe̠ri	taat	naaŋ	twoo	twaani (5+ 1) ?	twarfo (5+ 2) ?	naaraŋ (2 x 4) ?	mbwan kɔb (10 - 1)	kɔ́b
Western, Northwestern, Koro	Yeskwa (Nyenkpa)	ènyí	ènvà	èntât	ènnà	èntyúò	èncí	tònvà	tóndát	tyúôrá	ókóp
Western, Southwestern, A	Mada (Madda)	ɡyə̄r	ywā	tar	nlyɛ̄	tun	tānnɛ̀n	tāmɡ͡bā	tāndà	tīyār	ɡùr
Western, Southwestern, A	Ninzo	jír	há	tár	nə̄(s)	ʈʷí	tānì	tāŋɡ͡bā	tāndàr	tīr(s)	wūr
Western, Southwestern, A	Rukuba (Che)	ɡyín	-hàk	-tát	-nàs	-túŋ	tàiŋ	taŋbák	taːrat	taːras	uwùruk
Western, Southwestern, B	Eggon (1)	ákiə́n	àhàà	àtráá	ùɲí	òtnó	ùfín (5+ 1)	àfóhà (5+ 2)	àfóté (5+ 3)	àfúúɲí (5+ 4)	ókpo
Western, Southwestern, B	Eggon (2)	òrí	ɔ̀hà	ɔ̀cá	òɲì	ɔ̀tnɔ̂	ə̀fĩ́ (5+ 1)	ɔ̀fɔ́hà (5+ 2)	ɔ̀fɔ́tɛ́ (5+ 3)	ɔ̀fɔ̂ɲí (5+ 4)	ɔ̀kbɔ́

== See also ==
- List of Plateau reconstructions (Wiktionary)
- Systematic graphic of the Niger–Congo language family
