= Outline of the Middle Belt =

Middle Belt

Flag of the Middle Belt

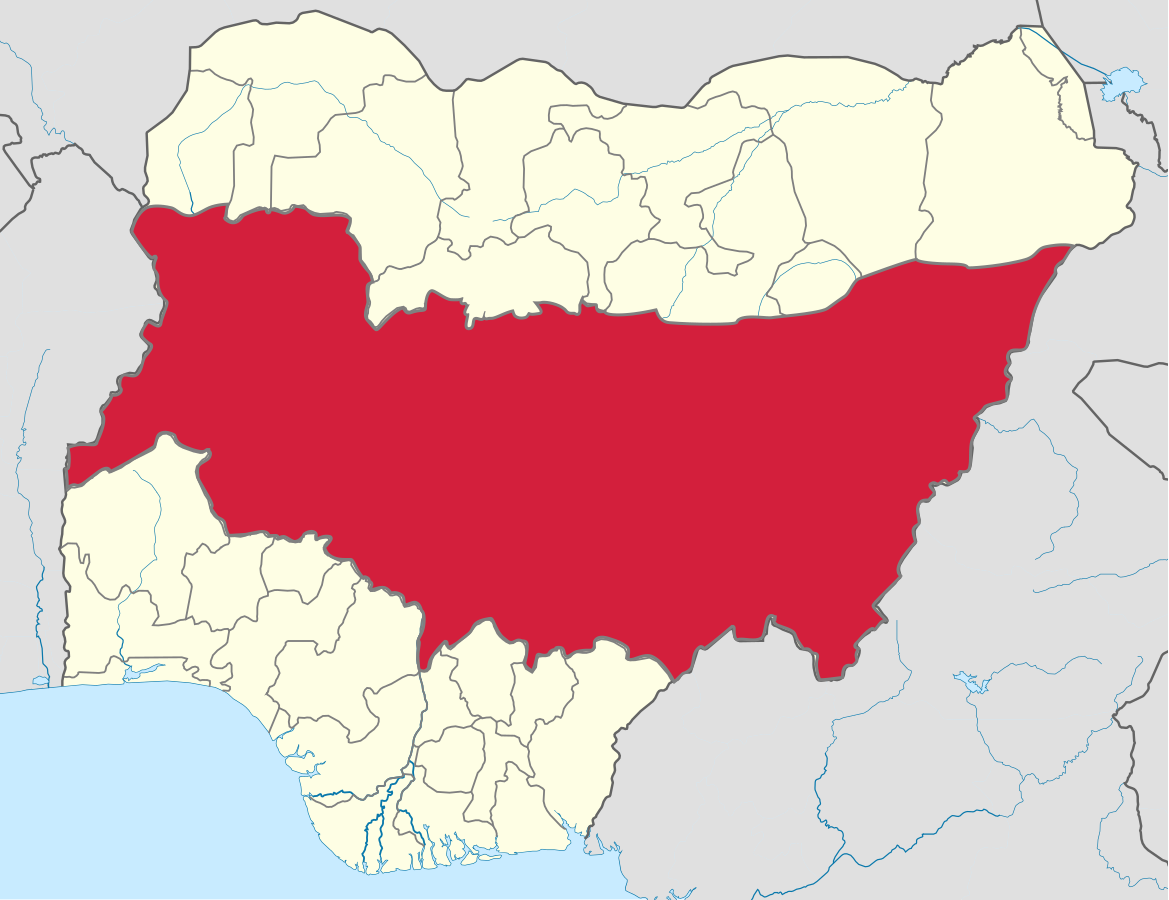
Map of the Middle Belt of Nigeria

The following outline is provided as an overview of and topical guide to the Middle Belt:

Middle Belt or Central Nigeria – A region located at the centre of Nigeria separating the north and south. It shares borders with Cameroon to the east and the Republic of Benin to the west. Its vegetation is majorly tropical savanna, with short grass savanna to the north and woodland and tall grass savanna to the centre and south, with montane forests to its southeastern tip. The two major rivers in Nigeria, the Niger and Benue rivers flow across its western and eastern territories, respectively.

== General reference ==
- Names
  - Common name(s): Middle Belt, Central Nigeria
- Adjectival: Middle Belt
- Demonyms:
  - Middle Belter

== Geography of the Middle Belt ==
- Middle Belt is: a region of Nigeria
- Location
  - Northern Hemisphere
  - Eastern Hemisphere
    - Africa
      - West Africa
        - Nigeria
- Population of the Middle Belt: c. 45,000,000

=== Places in the Middle Belt ===
Places in the Middle Belt

- Historic places in the Middle Belt
  - National Historic Landmarks in the Middle Belt
- Parks in the Middle Belt

=== Environment of the Middle Belt ===
- Climate of the Middle Belt
- Protected areas in the Middle Belt
  - Forest reserves of the Middle Belt
- Wildlife of the Middle Belt
  - Fauna of the Middle Belt

==== Natural geographic features of the Middle Belt ====
- Lakes of the Middle Belt
- Mountains of the Middle Belt
- Rivers of the Middle Belt

=== States of the Middle Belt ===
- Adamawa State
- Benue State
- Federal Capital Territory
- Kogi State
- Kwara State
- Nasarawa State
- Niger State
- Plateau State
- Southern Bauchi
- Southern Borno
- Southern Gombe
- Southern Kaduna
- Southern Kebbi
- Southern Yobe
- Taraba State

==== Administrative divisions of the Middle Belt ====
- Local Government Areas of the Middle Belt
  - Municipalities in the Middle Belt
    - Cities in the Middle Belt
      - capital of the Middle Belt
    - Towns in the Middle Belt

== Culture of the Middle Belt ==
- Nok culture
- World Heritage Sites in the Middle Belt
  - Sukur Cultural Landscape
  - Gashaka Gumti National Park (tentative)
- Traditional kingship institutions
  - Chiefdoms and kingdoms
    - Abaga Toni, Ad'Ogbadibo, Agora of Zuba, Aguma of Bassa, Agwam (Asholyio, Bajju, Fantswam, Oegworok, Takad), Agwatyap, Agwom (Adara, Izere), Aku Uka, Andoma of Doma, Aren Eggon, Attah Igala, Bra Ngwe Irigwe, B'gwam Akurmi, Chun Mada, Esu Bwari, Etsu (Agaie, Lapai, Nupe, Patigi, Shonga), Gara Donga, Gbong Gwom Jos, Kpop (Gwong, Ham), Long (Goemai, Tel), Mishkaham Mwaghavul, Ngolong Ngas, Obaro of Kabba, Och'Idoma, Ochi'Igede, Ogomo Pengana, Ohimege Igu, Ohinoyi of Ebiraland, Olofa of Offa, Ona of Abaji, Osu Ajiri, Ponzhi Tarok, Rekna Bashar, Res Tsam, Sa Gbagyi (now Esu Chikun), Sa'Rubochi, Saf Ron-Kulere, Sangarin Awe, Tor Tiv, Tum Nikyob
  - Emirates
    - Emir of (Borgu, Dass, Gwanara, Ilesha Baruba, Ilorin, Jama'a, Kagara, Kagarko, Kaiama, Kajuru, Kanam, Kauru, Keffi, Kontagora, Lafia, Lafiagi, Lere, Minna, Muri, Nasarawa, Okuta, Suleja, Tsaragi, Wase, Yashikira, Yauri, Zuru), Etsu (Agaie, Lapai, Nupe, Patigi, Shonga), Lamido of (Adamawa, Gashaka).
- Religious and social institutions
  - Indigenous
    - Abwoi religion
    - Alekwu
    - Kwagh-Hir
    - Tiv religion and beliefs
  - Christian and civic institutions
    - Church of Christ in Nations (COCIN)
    - Evangelical Church Winning All (ECWA)
    - Nongu u Kristu u i Ser u sha Tar (NKST)
    - United Middle Belt Congress (UMBC)
- Festivals and arts
  - Cultural festivals and canivals
    - Afan festival
    - Akata Benue Fishing Festival
    - Ayet Atyap annual cultural festival
    - Idoma Carnival
    - Ndako Gboya (Igunnuko Festival)
    - Nupe Cultural Day
    - Nwonyo Fishing Festival
    - Pategi Regatta Festival
    - Southern Kaduna festival
  - Film and cinema
    - Abuja International Film Festival
  - Literary festivals
    - Kaduna Book and Arts Festival

== History of the Middle Belt ==
=== History of the Middle Belt, by period ===
- Trans-Saharan slave trade
- Nok culture
- Kwararafa Confederacy
- Songhai Empire
- History of Nigeria before 1500
- Igala–Benin War
- Trans-Atlantic slave trade
- Igbo–Igala wars
- Jihad of Usman dan Fodio
- Battle of Ilorin
- Royal Niger Company Constabulary
- Northern Nigeria Regiment (WAFF)
- Colonial wars of subjugation in the Middle Belt
  - Conquest of the Niger–Benue confluence (1896–1920s)
    - Kabba expedition (1896–1897)
    - Bida and Ilorin campaigns (1897)
    - Idah Expedition of 1897
      - Bombardment of Idah (1897)
      - Expedition against Arku (1897)
    - Lapai and Abuja expeditions (1898)
    - Second Bida and Kontagora expeditions (1901)
    - Okpoto expedition (1903–1904)
    - Idoma and Igala pacification patrols (1907–1918)
    - Ogwulugwu rebellion (1916–1918)
  - Kontagora campaign (1900)
  - Muri and Wukari expeditions (1900–1904)
  - Conquest of non-centralized polities (1900s–1920s)
    - Tiv resistance (1900–1907)
      - Tiv expedition (1906)
      - Munshi (Tiv) patrols (1911–1920s)
    - Southern Zaria and Gbagyi resistance (1900–1910s)
    - Plateau Punitive expeditions (1902–1915)
    - Eggon and Mada resistance (1902–1917)
    - Tangale, Waja, and Mumuye expeditions (1904–1920s)
    - Tilde expedition (1905–1907)
  - Conquest of Yola (1901)
  - Occupation of Keffi, the Maloney affair, and the conquest of Nasarawa (1902)
- Northern Region, Nigeria
- Amalgamation of Nigeria
  - Indirect rule
  - World War I
- Willink Commission
- Nigerian Civil War
- 1966 Nigerian counter-coup
- Langtang Mafia
- April 1990 Coup d'État
- 1992 Zangon Kataf crises
- Religious violence in the Middle Belt
  - 2000 Kaduna riots
  - 2001 Jos riots
  - Miss World riots
  - 2008 Jos riots
  - 2010 Jos riots
- 2014 National Conference, Nigeria
- Fulani extremism in the Middle Belt
  - Killings in Southern Kaduna
  - Agatu massacres
  - 2019 Kaduna State massacre
  - 2023 Mangu violence
  - April 2022 Benue State killings
  - Yelwata massacre

== Language in the Middle Belt ==
- Afroasiatic languages
  - Chadic languages
    - Biu–Mandara (Central Chadic languages)
      - South
        - South
          - Bata (A.8)
            - Bata Proper: Bacama, Bata (Gbwata), Fali, Gude, Gudu, Holma (†), Ngwaba (from A.1 Tera), Nzanyi
            - Tsuvan: Zizilivakan
          - Daba (A.7)
            - Daba Proper: Daba
          - Mafa (= South A.5 Mafa (d)): Mafa
          - Tera (A.1):
            - East Tera: Boga, Ga'anda, Hwana
            - (West Tera): Jara, Tera
          - Sukur (A.6)
    - West Chadic
      - Hausa–Gwandara (A.1)
        - Gwandara
      - Bole–Angas (?)
        - Bole–Tangale (A.2)
          - North (Bole proper): Bure, Karekare, Bole, Gera, Geruma, Deno, Galambu, Giiwo, Kubi, Ngamo, Maaka (Maagha), Ɓeele, Daza (Dazawa), ?Pali
          - South (Tangale): Kwaami, Pero, Piya-Kwonci, Kholok, Nyam, Kushi (Goji), Kutto (Kupto), Tangale, Dera (Kanakuru)
        - Angas (Central West Chadic) (A.3)
          - Ngasic: Ngas (Angas), Belnǝng
          - Mwaghavulic: Mwaghavul, Mupun (Mapun), Takas (Toos); Cakfem-Mushere
          - Miship (Chip)
          - Pan cluster
            - Chakato/Jorto
            - Jipal, Mernyang (Mirriam), Kwagallak, Kofyar (Doemak), Bwol, Goram, Jibyal
          - Nteng
          - Tel (Tɛɛl, Montol)
          - Talic: Tal, Pyapun, Koenoem
          - Goemaic: Goemai
          - Yiwom (Ywom, Gerka)
        - Ron (A.4): Fyer, Tambas, Ron (Bokkos, Daffo-Butura, Mangar, Monguna), Shagawu, Duhwa (Karfa), Kulere (Tof, Richa, Kamwai-Marhai), Mundat, Sha
      - Bade–Warji (?)
        - Bade (B.1): Duwai; Bade, Shira (†), Ngizim, Teshenawa (†), Auyokawa (†)
        - Warji (North Bauchi) (B.2): Pa'a; Warji, Diri, Ciwogai, Kariya (Vinahə), Mburku, Miya, Siri, Zumbun (Jimbin), Ajawa (†)
      - Barawa (South Bauchi) (B.3)
        - Zaar: Dass; Geji, Polci (Polchi), Saya, Zari, Zeem
        - Guruntum: Guruntum-Mbaaru, Ju, Tala, Zangwal
        - Boghom: Jimi, Jum; Boghom, Kir-Balar, Mangas
        - North
          - Margi–Mandara–Mofu
            - Margi (A.2)
              - Bura: Bura, Cibak, Putai, Nggwahyi
              - Margi Proper: Kilba, Margi South, Margi
            - Mandara (A.4):
              - Wandala: Mandara (Malgwa), Glavda
              - Dghwede: Cineni, Dghwede, Guduf, Gava, Gvoko
          - Lamang
            - Lamang (West A.4 Wandala): Lamang, Hdi, Mabas
          - Higi
            - Higi (A.3): Hya, Psikyɛ, Kamwe, Kirya-Konzel
          - Musgum – North Kotoko
            - Kotoko Island: Buduma
            - Kotoko North: Afaɗə
        - Jilbe (unclassified)
      - Angas languages (Central West Chadic languages)
        - Ngasic: Ngas (Angas), Belnǝng; ?Miler
        - Mwaghavulic: Mwaghavul, Mupun (Mapun), Takas (Toos); Cakfem-Mushere
        - Miship (Chip)
        - Pan cluster
          - Chakato; Jorto (spurious)
          - Jipal, Mernyang (Mirriam), Kwagallak, Kofyar (Doemak), Bwol, Goram, Jibyal
        - Nteng
        - Tel (Tɛɛl, Montol)
        - Talic: Tal, Pyapun, Koenoem
        - Goemaic: Goemai
        - Yiwom (Ywom, Gerka)
- Niger–Congo languages
  - Atlantic–Congo
    - Volta–Congo languages
      - Benue–Congo languages (East Benue–Congo languages)
        - Bantoid–Cross
          - Bantoid
            - Northern Bantoid
              - Tikar (divergent)
              - Mambiloid (possibly including the divergent Ndoro–Fam languages)
                - Ndoola (Ndoro)
                - Mambiloid proper
                  - Mambila–Konja
                    - Mambila–Vute
                      - Mambila–Kamkam
                        - Magu–Kamkam–Kila: Mbongno (Kamkam), Mvanip (Mvano), ?Somyev, ?Ndunda
                        - Mambila
                      - Tep–Vute
                        - Tep
                        - Vute: Vute, Wawa
              - Dakoid
                - Donga (Dong)
                - Gãã (Tiba)
                - Daka–Taram
                  - Taram
                  - Daka (a dialect cluster of Dirim, Samba, Lamja, Dengsa, and Tola)
            - Southern Bantoid
              - Tivoid
                - Central Tivoid
                  - A
                    - Tiv–Iyive–Otank
                    - Ceve (Oliti)
                - North Tivoid
                  - Batu (Afi, Kamino)
                  - Abon
                  - Bitare
                  - ? Ambo
              - Grassfields
                - Narrow Grassfields
                  - Eastern Grassfields
                    - Yamba
                    - Nkambe languages
                      - Limbum
                      - Dzodinka
                - Ring
                  - LamNsọ
              - Jarawan
                - Nigerian Jarawan
                  - Numan
                    - 'Bile (Bille)
                    - Mbula-Bwazza (dialect cluster): Mbula, Bwazza, Tambo
                  - Mama (also sometimes called Kantana)
                  - Lame (dialect cluster consisting of Rufu, Mbaru, Gura)–Gwa
                  - Kulung
                  - Jaku–Gubi: Shiki (Gubi), Dulbu, Labir (Jaku)
                  - Jarawa (dialect cluster): Mbat (Baɗa), Galamkya, Duguri (Doori), Bankal, Kantana, Gwak, Danglong
        - Central Nigerian or Platoid (Nenzit) languages
          - Jukunoid
            - Kuteb
            - Lau
            - Nyifon (Iordaa)
            - Central
              - Kpan–Icen
                - Etkywan (Icen)
                - Kpan
              - Jukun–Mbembe–Wurbo
                - Jukun
                  - Jukun (Jukun Takum)
                  - Jibu
                  - Hõne
                  - Wãpha
                  - Jan Awei
                - Kororofa
                  - Wannu
                  - Wapan
                  - Jiba
                - Mbembe (Tigon)
                - Wurbo
                  - Como Karim
                  - Jiru
                  - Shoo-Minda-Nye
          - Yukubenic
            - Bete, Lufu
            - Kapya
            - Afudu
            - Akum, Beezen–Baazəm
            - Yukuben (Uuhum Gigi)
          - Kainji
            - West Kainji
              - Lake
                - Reshe
                - Upper Niger
                  - Sengwe/Laru
                  - Oleran/Lopa: Rop, Cuba
              - Central
                - Basa, Eastern
                  - A
                    - A.1
                      - Basa-Kontagora
                      - Basa-Gumna
                    - A.2
                      - Kɔrɔmba (Basa-Gurmana)
                  - B
                    - B.1
                      - Basa-Gurara
                      - Basa-Kwali
                    - B.2
                      - Basa-Benue (Basa-Kwomu)
                      - Basa-Makurdi
                - Northwest
                  - Damakawa
                  - C'lela
                  - Hun-Saare/Duka; Wuri-Gwamhi-Mba, Ma'in/Fakai
                - Kambari (Shingini)
                  - Cicipu
                  - West: Gaushi/Auna, Kimba, Wunci/Agwara
                  - East: Shingini/Salka, Va'di, Bangi
                - Nuclear
                  - Shiroro
                    - Bauchi: Mun-Wayam, Rubo-Supana
                    - Gurmana
                    - Rin/Pongu, Waga
                    - Fungwa/Ura
                  - Kamuku-Hunwarya/Ngwoi
                    - Hunwarya/Ngwoi
                    - Kamuku
                      - Regi-Cinda-Kuki
                      - Rogo-Shiyabe, Zubazuba-East Acipa
                      - Shama
            - East Kainji
              - Amic: TiMap
              - Tsamic: Tsam (Chawai), Ngmgbang, Bishi (Piti)
              - Kaduna: Gbiri-Niragu (Gure-Kahugu), Shuwa-Zamani (Kuzamani), TiVori (Surubu), T'Kurmi (Kurama), Mala-Ruma, TiBin (Bina), Koono, Kaivi, Vono (Kibollo), Tumi, Dungu (Dingi), TiNu (Kinuku)
              - North-central cluster: Lemoro, Janji, Iguta (Guta), Zora (Cokobo) (moribund)
                - Shammɔ cluster: Sanga, Gusu, Moro, Loro, Bunu, Tunzu (Duguza)
                  - (branch): Zele (Jere), Boze, Panawa
              - Northern Jos group:
                - Sheni cluster: Ziriya (extinct), Kere (extinct), Sheni (almost extinct)
                - Lere cluster: Si (extinct), Gana (extinct), Takaya (extinct)
                - Lame cluster: Gyem, Shau (extinct)
                - Ningi cluster: Kudu-Camo (almost extinct), Gamo-Ningi (Butu-Ningi) (extinct)
          - Plateau
            - Tarokoid
              - A
                - Tarok-Pe
                  - Tarok (Yergam)
                  - Pe (Pai)
                - Yangkam (Bashar)
              - B
                - Sur (Myet, Tapshin)
                - Kwang (Kwanka)
                - Shall-Zwall
            - South
              - Eggonic
                - Eggon
                - Ake
              - Jilic (Koro)
                - Jili (Lijili)
                - Jijili (Tanjijili)
            - ? East
              - Bo-Rukul
              - Horom-Pyem
                - Horom
                - Pyem
            - Ndunic (Ahwai): Ndun, Nyeng, Shakara
            - Alumic
              - Alumu-Toro
                - Alumu
                  - Alumu-Tesu
                  - Akpondu
                - Toro (Turkwam)
              - Hasha-Sambe
                - Sambe
                - Hasha (Yashi)
            - Ninzic
              - Ce (Che, Rukuba)
              - Ninzo (Ninzam)
              - Mada
              - Nikyob (Kaninkon)–Nindem
              - Anib (Kanufi)
              - Gwantu (Gbantu)
              - Bu-Ninkada (Gbu)
              - Ningye
              - Nungu
              - Ninka
              - Gbətsu
              - Nkɔ
              - ? Ayu
            - ? West-Central
              - Rigwe
              - Izeric
                - Izere: NE & NW Izere, Cèn, Ganàng
                - Fəràn (Firan, Ibaas) – clearly related to Izere
              - Tyapic
                - Tyap (Katab): Tyap proper (Mabatado, Mabarado), Gwolog/Gworog, Takad, Cacrak, Sholyio, Fantswam, Tuku
                - Jju (Kaje)
              - Hyamic
                - Kyoli (Cori)
                - Yat (Dangana)
                - Hyam (Jaba): Hyam of Nok, Sait, Dzar; maybe Yat (Yaat), Ankun also separate
                - Shamang
                - Zhire (Shang is relexified Zhire)
              - Koro
                - Koro: Ashe, Begbere-Ejar
                - Nyankpa (Yeskwa)
                - Idun (Duya), Gwara
              - Gyongic
                - Gyong (Kagoma)
                - Nghan (Kamantan)
            - North-West
              - Adara (Eda, Edra)
              - Ibiro-Ikryo (Kuturmi)
              - Kulu (Ikulu)
              - Ajiya (Idon)
              - Ejuele (Doka)
              - Iku (Iku-Gora-Ankwe)
            - Beromic
              - Shall-Zwall
                - Iten
                  - Cara (Teriya)
                  - Berom
            - ? Eloyi (Afo)
      - Volta–Niger languages (West Benue–Congo languages)
        - YEAI
          - Yoruboid
            - Proto-Yoruboid
              - Igala
              - Edekiri
                - Yoruba
                  - Okun (Northeast Yoruba, NEY)
        - NOI
          - Nupoid
            - Ebira–Gade
              - Ebira
              - Gade
            - Nupe–Gbagyi
              - Gbagyi-Gbari (Gwari)
              - Nupe
                - Asu
                - Core Nupe
                  - Nupe cluster
                    - Nupe (Nupe–Nupe-Tako)
                      - Nupe-Tako (Bassa Nupe, Bassa Nge)
                    - Dibo
                  - Gupa cluster
                    - Gupa-Abawa
                    - Kakanda
                    - Kami
                    - Kupa
          - Idomoid
            - Akpa
            - Etulo–Idoma
              - Etulo
              - Idoma
                - Idoma
                - Igede
                - Agatu
                - Alago
      - Savannas languages (Gur-Adamawa languages)
        - Bariba (a.k.a. "Baatonũ": ex-Gur)
        - Chamba–Mumuye a.k.a. Leko–Nimbari (ex-Adamawa: Leko (G2), Duru (G4), Mumuye–Yendang (G5))
          - Leko
            - Kolbila
            - Nyong
            - Chamba Leko
            - Wom
          - Duru
            - Vere–Dowayo
              - Koma
              - Vere (Mom Jango)
          - Mumuye–Yendang
            - Mumuye
              - Mumuye proper: Northeast Mumuye, Southwest Mumuye
              - Rang Mumuye: Rang
              - Pangseng Mumuye: Pangseng, Komo, Jega, etc.
            - Yendang (Maya)
              - Bali, Kpasham
              - Waka, Yendang (incl. Kusheki), Yoti
              - Teme
              - Gengle, Kugama (Wam), Kumba (Sate, Yofo)
        - Bambukic (ex-Adamawa: Bena–Mboi (G7), Bikwin–Jen (G9), Longuda (G10))
          - Ɓəna-Mboi (Yungur)
            - Ɓəna
              - Ɓəna Yungur
                - Ɓəna Yungur
                - Voro
              - Ɓəna Lala
                - Ɓəna Lala of Yang
                - Ɓəna Lala of Bodwai (Bodɛ)
                  - Robma
                  - (Robma of) Dingai
            - Mboi (Gəna)
              - Mboi of Livo; Mboi of Gulungo
              - Mboi of Haanda; Mboi of Banga
            - Kaan (Libo)
          - Bikwin-Jen
            - Bikwin
              - Burak-Loo
                - Burak [ɓʋʋrak]
                - Loo [shʋŋɔ]
              - Mak-Tal
                - Mak (LeeMak)
                  - Panya
                  - Zoo
                - Maɣdi (Tala)
              - Bikwin (proper)
                - Leelau (Munga Leelau)
                - Mɔɔ (Gomu)
                - Kya̰k (Bambuka)
            - Jen (Janjo)
              - Dza
                - Dza (local variants)
                - Joole, Jaule
              - Munga Doso
              - Tha [θá]
          - Longuda (Nʋngʋra)
        - Waja–Kam (ex-Adamawa: Tula–Waja (G1), Kam (G8))
          - Tula–Waja
            - Awak: Awak (Yebu), Kamo
            - Cham–Mona: Dijim-Bwilim, Tso
            - Dadiya
            - Tula: Bangwinji, Tula, Waja
          - Nyingwom (Kam)
        - ? Baa (a.k.a. "Kwa")
  - Mande
    - Southeast Mande
      - Eastern Mande
        - Bisa–Busa
          - Samo–Busa
            - Busa
              - Shanga–Tyenga
                - Shanga
                - Tyenga (Kyenga)
              - Busa–Boko
                - Boko
                - Busa (Bisã)
                  - Bokobaru
- Nilo-Saharan languages
  - Songhay
    - Southern Songhay
      - Dendi
  - Central Sudanic
    - Sara–Bongo–Bagirmi
      - Sara–Bagirmi
        - Sara
          - West
            - Lau Laka
