= List of ethnic groups in Nigeria =

== List of ethnic groups ==
The following is a non-exhaustive list of ethnic groups in Nigeria.

Name of ethnic group	State no
Abayon	Cross River State
Abua (Odual)	Rivers State
Achipa (Achipawa)	Kebbi State
Adara (Kadara)	Kaduna State, Niger State
Affade	Yobe State
Afizere	Plateau State
Afo (Eloyi)	Nasarawa State
Agbo	Cross River State
Akaju-Ndem (Akajuk)	Cross River State
Akweya-Yachi	Benue State
Alago (Arago)	Nasarawa State
Amo	Plateau State
Anaguta	Plateau State
Anang (Annang), Ibibio group	Akwa Ibom State
Andoni	Akwa Ibom State, Rivers State
Ankwei	Plateau State
Anyima	Cross River State
Atyap (Kataf/Katab, Attakar, Kagoro, Kafanchan, Marwa/Manchok)	Kaduna State
Auyoka (Sub-Hausa)	Jigawa State
Ayu	Kaduna State
Bura-Pabir	Adamawa State, Borno State, Yobe State
Bachama	Adamawa State
Bachere	Cross River State
Bada	Plateau State
Bade	Yobe State
Bahumono	Cross River State
Bakulung	Taraba State
Bali	Taraba State
Bambora (Bambarawa)	Bauchi State
Bambuko	Taraba State
Bajju (Kaje, Kajji)	Kaduna State
Banda (Bandawa)	Taraba State
Banka (Bankalawa)	Bauchi State
Banso (Panso)	Adamawa State
Bara (Barawa)	Bauchi State
Barke	Bauchi State
Baruba (Batonu)	Kwara State, Niger State
Bashiri (Bashirawa)	Plateau State
Bassa	Kaduna State, Kogi State, Niger State, Plateau State
Batta	Adamawa State
Baushi	Niger State
Baya	Adamawa State
Bekwarra	Cross River
Bele (Buli, Belewa)	Bauchi State
Berom (Birom)	Plateau State
Betso (Bete)	Taraba State
Bette	Cross River State
Bille	Adamawa State
Bille	Rivers State
Bina (Binawa)	Kaduna State
Bobua	Taraba State
Boki (Nki)	Cross River State
Bokkos	Plateau State
Boko (Bussawa, Bargawa)	Niger State
Bole (Bolewa)	Bauchi State, Gombe State, Yobe State
Botlere	Adamawa State
Boma (Bomawa, Burmano)	Bauchi State
Bomboro	Bauchi State
Buduma	Borno State,
Buji	Plateau State
Buli	Bauchi State
Bunu	Kogi State
Bura-Pabir	Adamawa State, Borno State, Yobe State
Burak	Bauchi State
Burma (Burmawa)	Plateau State
Buru	Yobe State
Buta (Butawa)	Bauchi State
Bwall	Plateau State
Bwatiye	Adamawa State
Bwazza	Adamawa State
Challa	Plateau State
Chama (Chamawa Fitilai)	Bauchi State
Chamba	Adamawa StateTaraba State,
Chamo	Bauchi State
Chibok (Kibaku people)	Borno State, Yobe State
Chinine	Borno State
Chip	Plateau State
Chokobo	Plateau State
Chukkol	Taraba State
Daba	Adamawa State
Dadiya	Bauchi State
Daka	Adamawa State
Dakarkari	Kebbi State, Niger State
Danda (Dandawa)	Kebbi State
Dangsa	Taraba State
Daza (Dere, Derewa)	Bauchi State
Deno (Denawa)	Bauchi State
Dghwede	Borno State
Diba	Taraba State
Doemak (Dumuk)	Plateau State
Ouguri	Bauchi State
Duka (Dukawa)	Kebbi State
Dundudun (Dunka)	Taraba State
Duma (Dumawa)	Bauchi State
Ebana (Ebani)	Rivers State
Ebira	Edo State, Kogi State, Ondo State
Ebu	Edo State, Kogi State
Edo	Edo State, Delta State, Ondo State
Efik	Cross River State
Egede (Igede)	Benue State, Cross River State
Eggon	Nasarawa State
Egun (Gu)	Lagos State, Ogun State
Ejagham	Cross River State
Ekajuk	Cross River State
Eket (Ibibio group)	Akwa Ibom
Ekoi	Cross River State
Engenni (Ngene)	Rivers State
Epie	Bayelsa State
Esan (Ishan)	Edo State
Esit Ekid (Ibibio group)	Akwa Ibom State
Etolu (Etilo)	Benue State
Etsako	Edo State
Etung	Cross River State
Etuno	Edo State
Palli	Adamawa State
Fulani (Fulbe)	Adamawa State, Bauchi State, Borno State, Gombe State, Jigawa State, Kaduna State, Kano State, Katsina State, Kebbi State, Kwara State, Niger State, Plateau State, Sokoto State, Taraba State, Yobe State, Zamfara State
Fyam (Fyem)	Plateau State
Fyer (Fer)	Plateau State
Ga'anda	Adamawa State
Gade people	Niger State Nasarawa State
Galambi	Bauchi State
Gamergu-Mulgwa	Borno State
Ganawuri	Plateau State
Gavako	Borno State
Gbedde	Kogi State
Gengle	Taraba State
Geji	Bauchi State
Gera (Gere, Gerawa)	Bauchi State
Geruma (Gerumawa)	Plateau State
Gingwak	Bauchi State
Gira	Adamawa State
Gizigz	Adamawa State
Goemai	Plateau State
Gokana (Kana)	Rivers State
Gombi	Adamawa State
Gornun (Gmun)	Taraba State
Gonia	Taraba State
Gubi (Gubawa)	Bauchi State
Gude	Adamawa State
Gudu	Adamawa State
Gure	Kaduna State
Gurmana	Niger State
Gururntum	Bauchi State
Gusu	Plateau State
Gwa (Gurawa)	Adamawa State
Gwamba	Adamawa State
Gwandara	Kaduna State, Niger State, Federal Capital Territory, Nasarawa State
Gwari (Gbagyi)	Kaduna State, Federal Capital Territory Abuja, Nasarawa State, Niger State, Kogi State
Gwong (Kagoma)	Kaduna State
Gwom	Taraba State
Gwoza (Waha)	Borno State
Gyem	Bauchi State
Ham (Hyam, Jaba, Jabba)	Kaduna State
Hausa	Bauchi State, Jigawa State, Kaduna State, Kano State, Katsina State, Kebbi State, Sokoto State, Taraba State, Gombe State, Yobe State, Zamfara State
Holma	Adamawa State
Hona	Adamawa State
Ibani	Rivers State
Ibeno	Akwa Ibom State
Ibibio	Akwa Ibom State, Abia State, Cross River State
Ichen	Adamawa State
Idoma	Benue State, Cross River State, Kogi State, Nassarawa State
Igala	Kogi State
Igbira	Kogi state
Igbo	Abia State, Anambra State, Delta State, Ebonyi State, Enugu State, Imo State, Rivers State, Benue State, Kogi State, Akwa Ibom State, Cross River State
Igede	Benue State, Cross River State
Ijumu	Kogi State
Ika	Delta State, Edo State
Ikom	Cross River State
Ikwerre	Rivers State
Irigwe	Plateau State
Iman	Akwa Ibom State
Isoko	Delta State, Bayelsa State
Itsekiri (Isekiri)	Delta State
Itu (Ibibio group)	Akwa Ibom State
Itu Mbon Uso (Ibibio group)	Akwa Ibom State
Iyala (Iyalla)	Cross River State
Izon (Ijaw)	Akwa-Ibom State, Bayelsa State, Delta State, Edo State, Ondo State, Rivers State
Jahuna (Jahunawa)	Taraba State
Jaku	Bauchi State
Jara (Jaar Jarawa Jarawa-Dutse)	Bauchi State
Jere (Jare, Jera, Jera, Jerawa)	Bauchi State, Plateau State
Jero	Taraba State
Jibu	Adamawa State
Jidda-Abu	Plateau State
Jimbin (Jimbinawa)	Bauchi State
Jipal	Plateau State
Jirai	Adamawa State
Joinkrama	Rivers State
Jonjo (Jenjo)	Taraba State
Jukun	Bauchi State, Benue State, Plateau State, Taraba State
Kaba (Kabawa)	Taraba State
Kalabari	Rivers State
Kajuru (Kajurawa)	Kaduna State
Kaka	Adamawa State
Kamaku (Karnukawa)	Kaduna State, Kebbi State, Niger State
Kambari	Kebbi State, Niger State
Kambu	Adamawa State
Kamwe	Adamawa State and Borno State (Republic of Cameroon)
Kanakuru (Dera)	Adamawa State, Borno State
Kanembu	Borno State
Kanikon	Kaduna State
Kantana	Plateau State
Kanuri	Adamawa State, Borno State, Taraba State, Yobe State, Nasarawa state.
Karai-karai (Karekare)	Bauchi State, Yobe State
Karimjo	Taraba State
Kariya	Bauchi State
Ke	Rivers State
Kenern (Koenoem)	Plateau State
Kenton	Taraba State
Kiballo (Kiwollo)	Kaduna State
Kilba	Adamawa State
Kirfi (Kirfawa)	Bauchi State
Kodei	Taraba State
Kona	Taraba State
Kono	Kaduna State
Koro (Kwaro)	Kaduna State, Niger State
Kubi (Kubawa)	Bauchi State
Kudachano (Kudawa)	Bauchi State
Kugama	Taraba State
Kugbo	Rivers State
Kulere (Kaler)	Plateau State
Kunini	Taraba State
Kurama (Akurmi)	Kaduna State, Jigawa State
Kurdul	Adamawa State
Kushi	Bauchi State
Kuteb	Taraba State
Kutin	Taraba State
Kwalla	Plateau State
Kwale	Delta State
Kwami (Kwom)	Bauchi State
Kwanchi	Taraba State
Kadung	Bauchi State, Plateau State
Kwaro	Plateau State
Kwato	Plateau State
Kyenga (Kengawa)	Kebbi State
Laaru (Larawa)	Niger State
Lakka	Adamawa State
Lala	Adamawa State
Lama	Taraba State
Lamja	Taraba State
Lau	Taraba State
Limono	Bauchi State, Plateau State
Lopa (Lupa, Lopawa)	Niger State
Longuda (Lunguda)	Adamawa State, Bauchi State
Mabo	Plateau State
Mada	Kaduna State, Plateau State
Mama	Plateau State
Mambilla	Adamawa State
Mandara (Wandala)	Borno State
Manga (Mangawa)	Yobe State
Margi (Marghi)	Adamawa State, Borno State
Mafa	Adamawa State, Borno State
Mbembe	Cross River State, Enugu State
Mbol	Adamawa State
Mbube	Cross River State
Mbula	Adamawa State
Mbum	Taraba State
Memyang (Meryan)	Plateau State
Milighili (Mighili)	Plateau State
Miya (Miyawa)	Bauchi State
Mobber	Borno State
Montol	Plateau State
Moruwa (Moro'a, Morwa)	Kaduna State
Muchaila	Adamawa State
Mumuye	Taraba State
Mundang	Adamawa State
Munga (Lelau)	Taraba State
Munga (Mupang)	Plateau State
Mupun	Plateau State
Mushere	Plateau State
Mwahavul (Mwaghavul)	Plateau State
Ndoro	Taraba State
Ngas (Angas)	Plateau State, Bauchi State
Ngizim	Yobe State
Ngweshe (Ndhang.Ngoshe-Ndhang)	Adamawa State, Borno State
Nyiffon	Benue State
Ningi (Ningawa)	Bauchi State
Ninzam (Ninzo)	Kaduna State, Plateau State
Njayi	Adamawa State
Nkim	Cross River State
Nkum	Cross River State
Nokere (Nakere)	Plateau State
Nunku	Kaduna State, Plateau State
Nupe	Kogi State, Kwara State, Niger State
Nyam	Taraba State
Nyandang	Taraba State
Obolo	Rivers State, Akwa Ibom
Ododop	Cross River
Ogba	Rivers State
Ogori	Kogi State
Okobo (Okkobor)	Akwa Ibom State
Okirika	Rivers State
Okpamheri	Edo State
Olukumi	Delta State
Oron	Akwa Ibom State
Orring	Benue State Cross River State Ebonyi State
Ososo	Edo State
Owan	Edo State
Owe	Kogi State
Oworo	Kogi State
Pa'a (Pa'awa Afawa)	Bauchi State
Pai	Plateau State
Panyam	Taraba State
Pero	Bauchi State
Pire	Adamawa State
Pkanzom	Taraba State
Poll	Taraba State
Polchi Habe	Bauchi State
Pongo (Pongu)	Niger State
Potopo	Taraba State
Pyapun (Piapung)	Plateau State
Qua	Cross River State
Rebina (Rebinawa)	Bauchi State
Reshe	Kebbi State, Niger State
Rindire (Rendre)	Plateau State
Rishuwa	Kaduna State
Ron	Plateau State
Rubu	Niger State
Rukuba	Plateau State
Rumada	Kaduna State
Rumaya	Kaduna State
Sakbe	Taraba State
Sanga	Bauchi State
Sate	Taraba State
Saya (Sayawa Za'ar)	Bauchi State, Kaduna State, Plateau State
Segidi (Sigidawa)	Bauchi State
Shanga (Shangawa)	Kebbi State
Shangawa (ShanKadunagau)	Plateau State
Shan-Shan	Plateau State
Shira (Shira )	Bauchi State
Shomo	Taraba State
Shuwa (Baggara Arabs)	Adamawa State, Borno State, Kaduna State, Yobe State
Sikdi	Plateau State
Siri (Sirawa)	Bauchi State
Srubu (Surubu)	Kaduna State
Sukur	Adamawa State
Sura	Plateau State
Tangale	Gombe State
Tarok (Yergam)	Plateau State, Taraba State, Nasarawa State
Teme	Adamawa State
Tera (Terawa)	Bauchi State, Borno State
Teshena (Teshenawa)	Kano State
Tigon	Taraba State
Tikar	Taraba State
Tiv	Benue State, FCT, Nasarawa State, Niger State, Plateau State, Taraba State
Tula	Gombe State
Tur	Adamawa State
Ubbo	Adamawa State
Udekeama	Rivers State
Ufia	Benue State
Ukelle	Cross River State, Ebonyi state, Benue state
Ukwuani	Delta State, Rivers State
Uncinda	Kaduna State, Kebbi State, Niger State,
Uneme (Ineme)	Edo State
Ura (Ula)	Niger State
Urhobo	Delta State, Edo State, Bayelsa State.
Utonkong	Benue State
Uwanno (Weppa-Wanno)	Edo State
Uyanga	Cross River State
Uzairue	Edo state
Vemgo	Adamawa State
Verre	Adamawa State
Vommi	Taraba State
Wagga	Adamawa State
Waja	Bauchi State
Waka	Taraba State
Warja (Warja)	Bauchi State
Warji	Bauchi State
Wurbo	Adamawa State
Wurkun	Taraba State
Yache	Cross River State
Yagba	Kogi State
Yakurr (Yako)	Cross River State
Yalla	Benue State
Yandang	Adamawa State, Taraba State
Yoruba	Ekiti State, Edo State, Kogi State, Kwara State, Lagos State, Ogun State, Ondo State, Osun State, Oyo State
Yott	Taraba State
Yumu	Niger State
Yungur	Adamawa State
Yuom	Plateau State
Zabara	Niger State
Zaranda	Bauchi State
Zarma (Zarmawa)	Kebbi State
Zayam (Zeam)	Bauchi State
Zul (Zulawa)	Bauchi State
