= Jibyal language =

West Chadic language

Jibyal
- Ankwey
- Native to: Nigeria
- Region: Plateau State
- Native speakers: 2,000 (2017)
- Language family: Afro-Asiatic: Chadic; West Chadic; Bole–Angas; Angas (A.3); Pan; Jibyal

Language codes
- ISO 639-3: –
- Glottolog: jiby1234
- ELP: Jibyal

Jibyal (also known as Ankwey, a former name for the Goemai people) is a West Chadic language spoken in Plateau State, Nigeria. It was reported by Roger Blench in 2017.

Jibyal most likely belongs to the Pan cluster of languages, which includes Kofyar. Some similarities with Cakfem-Mushere have also been noted by Blench (2019). Jibyal is spoken in Jibyal town, and in the hamlets of Monkwat, Lamalang, Shimər, and Dalu. Blench (2017) reports 2,000 speakers total. Jibyal speakers intermarry with Bwal speakers. Children still speak the language, but it is still threatened by Hausa.

== Names ==
Jibyal speakers refer to themselves as Ankwei [àŋkwéy], which was also the name that the Goemai had formerly used to refer to themselves.

== Geographical distribution ==
Jibyal is spoken in Nasarawa State, near the border with Plateau State. It is spoken in Mangu LGA, situated to the west of the Panyam-Shendam road, to the south of Mushere. Villages and hamlets are Jibyal village, and Monkwat, Lamalang, Shimәr, and Dalu hamlets. Jibyal is situated to the north of Nteng, and to the west of Jipal (a distinctive language from Jibyal, despite the similar-sounding name).

== Phonology ==
Jibyal has vowel length contrast. Examples below:

Jibyal	Gloss	Jibyal	Gloss
sàr	ten	sáár	hand
sɛ́m	name	sɛ̄ːn	root
nānә́k	electric fish	bә̀lkә̀ːɾ	pigeon
mīs	man	mīīr	python
kɔ̄ŋ	stream	kɔ̄ɔ́	chicken
wúl	to arrive	yūūr	breast
