= Miler language =

West Chadic language

Miler
- Native to: Nigeria
- Region: Plateau State
- Native speakers: 1,200 (2022)
- Language family: Afro-Asiatic: Chadic; West Chadic; Bole–Angas; Angas (A.3); Miler

Language codes
- ISO 639-3: –

Miler is a West Chadic A3 language spoken in Pankshin LGA, Plateau State, Nigeria. It is spoken by about 1,000 people in three villages, which are within two small enclaves that are completely surrounded by Miship-speaking villages. It was first documented by Roger Blench in 2022.

Belnǝng and Tal are spoken just to the east in Shendam LGA, Plateau State.
