= Angas languages =

Angas
- Angas–Sura, Central West Chadic, A.3 West Chadic
- Geographic distribution: Shendam and Mangu LGAs, Plateau State, Nigeria
- Linguistic classification: Afro-Asiatic: Chadic; West Chadic; Angas

Language codes
- Glottolog: west2717
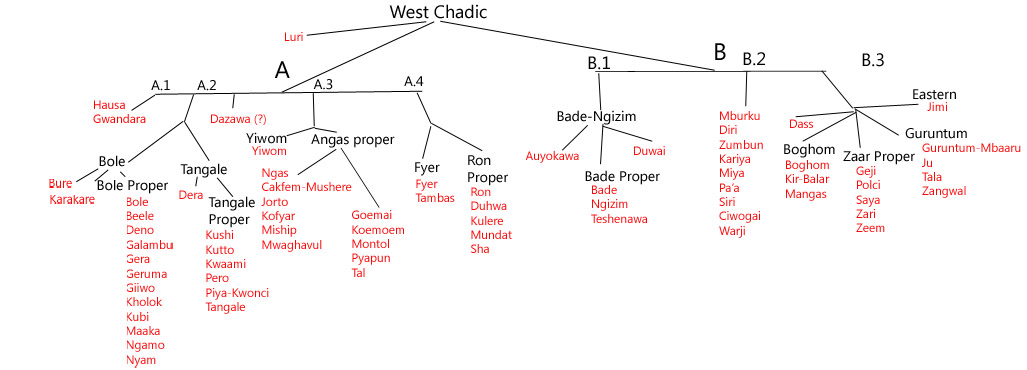
- West Chadic per Newman (1977)

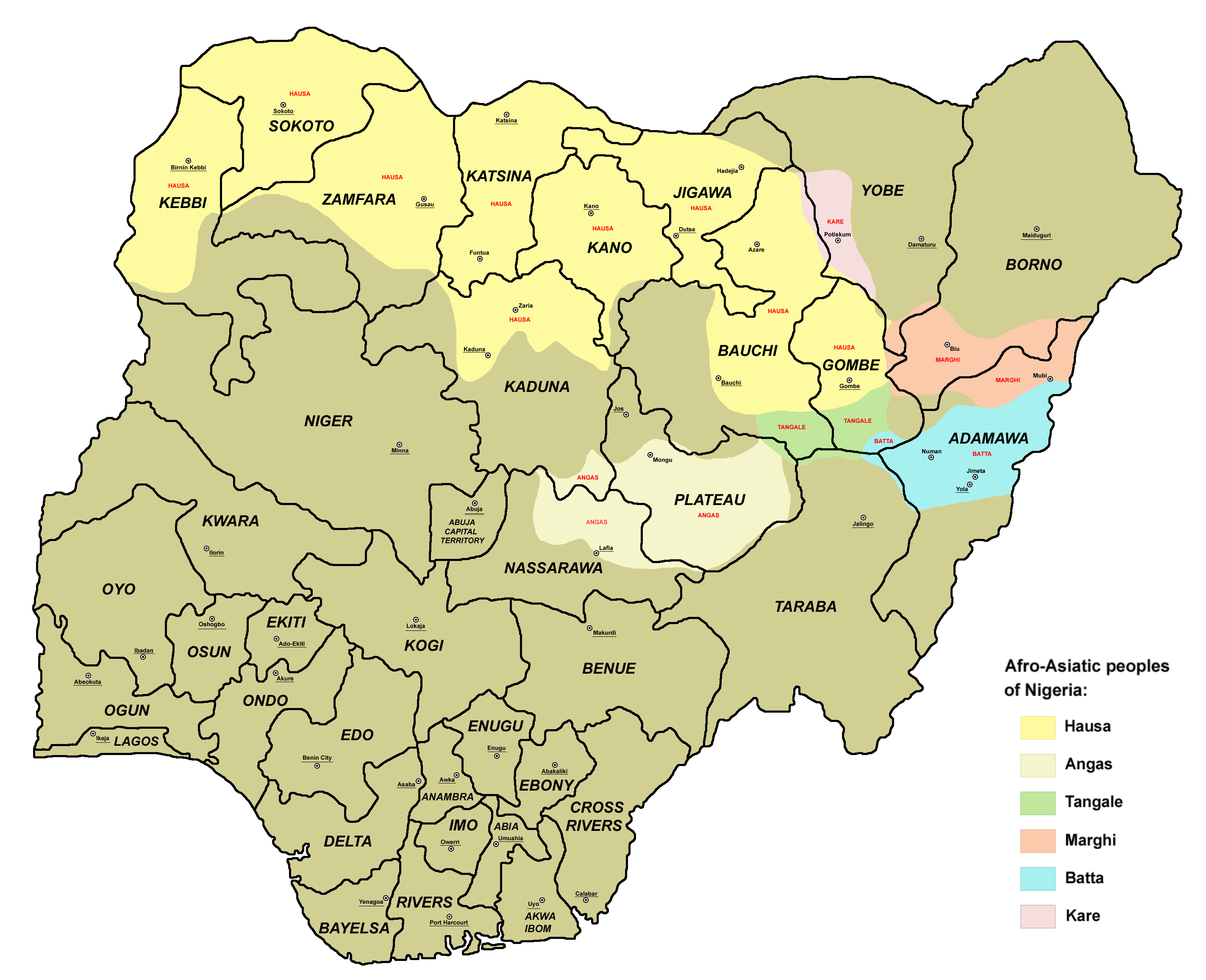
Main Chadic-speaking peoples in Nigeria

The Angas, Angas–Sura, or Central West Chadic languages (also known as A.3 West Chadic) are a branch of West Chadic languages spoken in Plateau State, north-central Nigeria.

== Languages ==
The Angas languages are:

Angas

- Ngasic: Ngas (Angas), Belnǝng; ?Miler
- Mwaghavulic: Mwaghavul, Mupun (Mapun), Takas (Toos); Cakfem-Mushere
- Miship (Chip)
- Pan cluster
  - Chakato; Jorto (spurious)
  - Jipal, Mernyang (Mirriam), Kwagallak, Kofyar (Doemak), Bwol, Goram, Jibyal
- Nteng
- Tel (Tɛɛl, Montol)
- Talic: Tal, Pyapun, Koenoem
- Goemaic: Goemai
- Yiwom (Ywom, Gerka)

Note that in the language names, orthographic oe stands for the mid central vowel /ə/, a practice that had been adopted by missionaries in the Shendam area during the 1930s, such as Father E. Sirlinger.

Unlike many other West Chadic languages, Angas languages do not have complex nominal and verbal morphology.

Ywom is the most divergent language.

== Phonology ==
Some phonological characteristics that are typical of the Chadic A3 languages:

- Palatalised consonants
- Implosive consonants ɓ, ɗ
- Six-vowel system consisting of i, ɨ, u, ɛ, ɔ, a
- Three tone levels

== Morphology ==
The West Chadic A3 languages have isolating morphology due to typological convergence with the Plateau languages. Blench (2022) notes that there are many morphological similarities with Berom, Izere, and Ninzic languages (such as Mada), although there are no immediately identifiable direct lexical borrowings. Although Hausa and the West Chadic A3 languages share many lexical cognates, Hausa is much more morphologically complex. This is because Hausa originated from outside the Plateau area and had thus not undergone intensive long-term contact with Plateau languages to the extent that West Chadic A3 had.

Plurals are marked with an *mV- affix throughout West Chadic A3 languages.

== Lexicon ==
The West Chadic A3 languages are lexically innovative, having lost many common Chadic lexical roots as with the Ron and South Bauchi languages. Blench (2022) suggests that this is due to borrowing from Plateau languages that have since become extinct and/or assimilated.

== Names and locations ==
Below is a comprehensive list of Angas language names, populations, and locations from Blench (2019).

Language	Cluster	Dialects	Alternate spellings	Own name for language	Endonym(s)	Other names (location-based)	Other names for language	Exonym(s)	Speakers	Location(s)	Notes
Miship		Longmaar, Jiɓaam	Ship, Chip, Cip						10,127 (Ames 1934), 6,000 (SIL)	Plateau State, Mangu and Shendam LGAs	
Cakfem–Mushere cluster	Cakfem–Mushere										
Cakfem	Cakfem–Mushere	Jajura	Chakfem, Chokfem						5,000 (SIL)	Plateau State, Mangu LGA	
Mushere	Cakfem–Mushere	Mushere is sharply divided into two dialects, plus Kadim spoken in a single village	Mushere						About 13 villages	Plateau State, Mangu LGA	
Ngas		Hill and Plain	Nngas Ngas		Kerang				55,250 (1952 W&B)	Plateau State, Pankshin, Kanam and Langtang LGAs	
Ywom			Yiwom				Gerkanci, Gurka	Gerkawa	2,520 (Ames 1934); 8,000 (1973 SIL)	Plateau State, Shendam and Langtang LGAs	
Jorto									4,876 (1934 Ames)	Plateau State, Shendam LGA, at Dokan Kasuwa	Spurious language? (No data)
Koenoem			Kanam						1,898 (1934 Ames); 3,000 (SIL)	Plateau State, Shendam LGA	
Kofa		Locally said to be a separate language; linguistic status uncertain	Kota							Adamawa State, Song LGA, north of Belel road a Chadic language of the Bura group	
Tel			Teel, Tehl			Baltap, Montoil, Montol			13,386 (1934 Ames); 20,000 (1973 SIL)	Plateau State, Shendam LGA	
Mwaghavul cluster	Mwaghavul										
Mwaghavul	Mwaghavul		Mwahavul				Sura	Sura	20,000 (1952 W&B); 40,000 (1973 SIL); current informal estimates suggest around 200,000 speakers	Plateau State, Barkin Ladi and Mangu LGAs	
Mupun	Mwaghavul		Mapan								
Takas	Mwaghavul		Toos								
Pan cluster	Pan				Kofyar				72,946 (1963)	Plateau State, Shendam, Mangu and Lafia LGAs	
Mernyang	Pan	Larr/Lardang and Mikiet are said to be 'offsets' of Mirriam							16,739 (1963)	Plateau State, Shendam LGA	
Doemak	Pan		Dәmak, Dimmuk		Kofyar	Kwong				Plateau State, Shendam LGA	
Tèŋ	Pan		Teng							Plateau State, Qaʼan Pan LGA	no data
Kwagallak	Pan	Nteng (Jasikit)? no data	Kwaʼalang				Kwalla, Kwolla		25,403 (1963)	Plateau State, Shendam LGA	
Bwol	Pan		Bwal, Mbol						3,853 (1963)	Nasarawa State, Lafia LGA	
Gworam	Pan		Giverom, Goram						3,055 (1952)	Nasarawa State, Lafia LGA	
Jipal	Pan		Jepel, Jepal, Jibyal							Plateau State, Mangu LGA	
Shindai	Pan									Plateau State, Qaʼan Pan LGA, Namu District	no data
Goemai	Goemaic						Ankwai, Ankwe		13,507 in Shendam (1934 Ames); 80,000 (1973 SIL)	Nasarawa State, Shendam, Awe and Lafia LGAs	
Tal	Talic	6 dialects recognised, although all are mutually intelligible		Amtul [=Hampul]		Kwabzak			9,210 (1934 Ames); 10,000 (1973 SIL); 26,000 (2014 estimate). Live in 52 settlements	Plateau State, Pankshin LGA	
Pyapung	Talic		Piapun, Pyapun						5,167 [including a 'few hundred Tal speakers' (Ames 1934); 10,000 (RMB est. 2016)	Plateau State, Shendam LGA	
