= Chakato language =

West Chadic language

Chakato
- Jakato; Jakattoe
- Native to: Nigeria
- Region: Plateau State
- Native speakers: 500 (2016)
- Language family: Afro-Asiatic: Chadic; West Chadic; Bole–Angas; Angas (A.3); Chakato

Language codes
- ISO 639-3: jrt
- Glottolog: chak1275 Chakato jort1240 Jakattoe
- ELP: Jakato

Chakato (Jakato [ʒàkàtɔ̀] or Jakattoe) is a West Chadic language spoken in Plateau State, Nigeria. It was identified by Roger Blench in 2016. It is spoken by about 500 people in one village, Dokan Tofa, which is located on the Jos-Shendam road in Plateau State. Blench (2017) suggests that Chakato may be related to spurious records of the Jorto language. Chakato speakers claim that their language is closely related to Goemai.

Jakato is spoken in Dokan Tofa town and nearby villages in southern Plateau State. Dokan Tofa town is situated about 50 km north of Shendam.

== Jorto ==
Jorto is a putative Afro-Asiatic language claimed to be spoken in Plateau State, Nigeria, and is currently listed in Ethnologue. It was introduced in an ethnographic study by C. G. Ames in 1934. It has now been retired by Glottolog, based on fieldwork evidence presented by Roger Blench that suggests that there is no independent evidence that Jorto ever existed.

On the other hand, a request to retire Jorto's ISO 639-3 jrt code was rejected because a team in Nigeria surveyed a region, that although they call their language as "Jakattoe", the "Jorto" is used by a neighboring people group. But the status of jrt code itself is later temporary changed to "Deprecated" in later 2020. In Jan 15, 2021, the SIL restored the jrt and changed its reference name to Jakattoe.
