= Alumu language =

Niger–Congo language spoken in Nigeria

Alumu-Tesu
- Təsu
- Native to: Nigeria
- Region: Nassarawa State
- Native speakers: (7,000 cited 1999)
- Language family: Niger–Congo?: Atlantic–Congo; Benue–Congo; Plateau; Alumic; Alumu-Toro; Alumu-Akpondu; Alumu-Tesu
- Dialects: Alumu; Tesu

Language codes
- ISO 639-3: aab
- Glottolog: alum1246

Alumu is a Plateau language spoken by approximately 7,000 people in Nassarawa State, Nigeria. It has lost the nominal affix system characteristic of the Niger–Congo family.

== Dialects ==
Two varieties, Alomoh and Tesu, differ only in intonation. Information for Alomoh and Tesu is listed from Blench (2004).

Alomoh (or Arum), with 4,000 speakers, is spoken in the settlements of Anji-Mara (main settlement), Tsavoh, Tapha, Tumara, Chugbu, Shu'a (Gbira), Chini.

Tesu (Təsu) (Hausa: Chessu), with just under 2,000 speakers, is spoken in the two villages of Chessu Sarki and Chessu Madaki, which are about one kilometre apart from each other on the Wamba - Fadan Karshi road.

Akpondoh is also closely related (also Babur, Nisam and Nigbo) but moribund or extinct, and its classification as a separate language or as a shifting dialect or sociological group of related dialects is not clear.

== Phonology ==
Consonant phonemes
	Labial	Alveolar	Palatal	Labialized palatal	Velar	Labialized velar	Glottal
Nasal	m	n	ɲ		ŋ		
Plosive	p b	t d	tʃ dʒ		k ɡ	kp ɡb	
Implosive	ɓ	ɗ					
Fricative	f v	s z	ʃ ʒ		x		h
Approximant		l	j	ɥ		w	
Tap		ɾ					
Trill		r					

Vowel phonemes
	Front	Central	Back
Close	i		u
Near-Close	ɪ		ʊ
Close-Mid	e		o
Open-Mid	ɛ	ə	ɔ
Open		a	

It is unclear whether or not vowel nasality is phonemic in Alumu.
