= Belnǝng language =

West Chadic language

Belnǝng
- Belning
- Native to: Nigeria
- Region: Shendam LGA, Plateau State
- Native speakers: 500 (2017)
- Language family: Afro-Asiatic: Chadic; West Chadic; Bole–Angas; Angas (A.3); Belnǝng

Language codes
- ISO 639-3: glb
- Glottolog: beln1234

Belnǝng (Belneng, Bǝlnǝng, Belning, Bɨlnɨng) is a West Chadic language of Shendam LGA, Plateau State, Nigeria closely related to Angas. It is spoken by about 500 people in the single village of Langung, which is surrounded by Tal villages in the east and Miship villages in the west (Blench 2017). It is documented in Blench & Bulkaam (2019).

== Lexicon ==
Some Belneng names of plants and animals:

Belneng name	Belneng name in IPA	English name	Scientific name
bǝbar	bə̀bāɾ	house bat	Scotophilus spp.
ɓip	ɓíp	grasscutter	Thryonomys swinderianus
ɓwaar	ɓʷāːɾ	yam	Dioscorea spp.
dashim	dàʃīm	monitor lizard	Varanus exanthematicus
ɗiin	ɗìːn	fruit bat	Rousettus aegyptiacus
fwem	fʷɛḿ	African fish eagle	Haliaeetus vocifer
goktaa	ɡɔ́ktáː	black and white-lipped cobra	Naja melanoleuca subfulva
gwan	ɡʷàn	cocoyam; taro	Colocasia esculenta
kaap	kāːp	baboon	Papio anubis
kǝn	kə̄n	buffalo; bush cow	Syncerus caffer
kut	kút	crocodile	Crocodylus niloticus
kyek	kʲɛḱ	porcupine	Hystrix cristata
lǝshim	lə̀ʃìm	leopard	Panthera pardus
lututut	lútūtūt	Senegal coucal	Centropus senegalensis
mer	mɛɾ̄	rock python	Python sebae
mfǝt	ɱfə̀t	mosquito	Anopheles spp.
mura	mùɾá	jackal	Canis adustus
nakwom	nàkʷɔ̄m	francolin; bush-fowl	Francolinus spp.
ngaan	ŋàːn	spitting cobra	Naja nigricollis nigricollis
ngwanglang	ᵑɡʷàŋlàŋ	millipede	Iule spp.
njolong	ⁿʤɔ̀lɔ̀ŋ	mason wasp	Belonogaster griseus
nkalǝng	ᵑkàlə́ŋ	pied crow	Corvus albus
nkamu	ᵑkàmù	hyena	Hyaena hyaena
nkiikii	ᵑkīːkíː	praying mantis	Sphodromantis phyllocrana
nlang	ⁿlāŋ	lizard	Agama agama
nwup	ⁿwūp	giant rat; pouched rat	Cricetomys gambianus
paap	pàːp	red-flanked duiker	Cephalophus rufilatus
pit	pìt	patas monkey	Erythrocebus patas
pupur	púpūɾ	hedgehog	Atelerix albiventris
shangkǝn	ʃáŋkə̄n	wall gecko	Gekkonidae
shomgot	ʃɔ̀mɡɔ̀t	dassie; rock rabbit; rock hyrax	Procavia capensis
shwishwen	ʃʷīʃʷɛn̄	aerial yam	Dioscorea bulbifera
shwom	ʃʷɔ̀m	guinea-fowl	Numida meleagris
tanglap	tàŋlàp	nightjar	Caprimulgus spp.
