= Scarification =

Cutting designs into the skin as a form of body modification

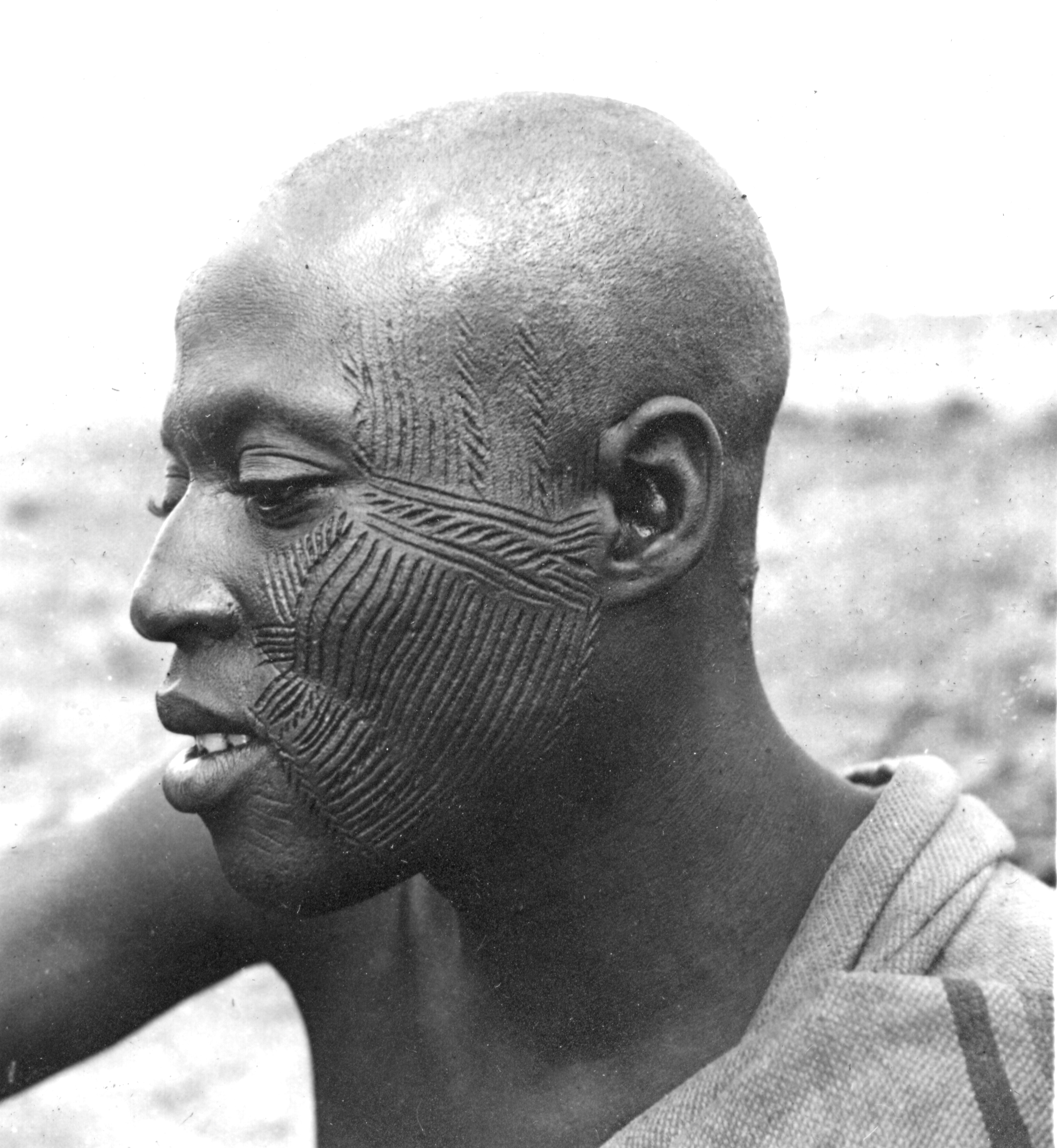
Detailed facial scarification

Scarification involves scratching, etching, burning/branding, or superficially cutting designs, pictures, or words into the skin as a permanent body modification or body art. The body modification can take roughly 6–12 months to heal. In the process of body scarification, scars are purposely formed by cutting or branding the skin by various methods (sometimes using further sequential aggravating wound-healing methods at timed intervals, like irritation). Scarification is sometimes called cicatrization.

== History ==
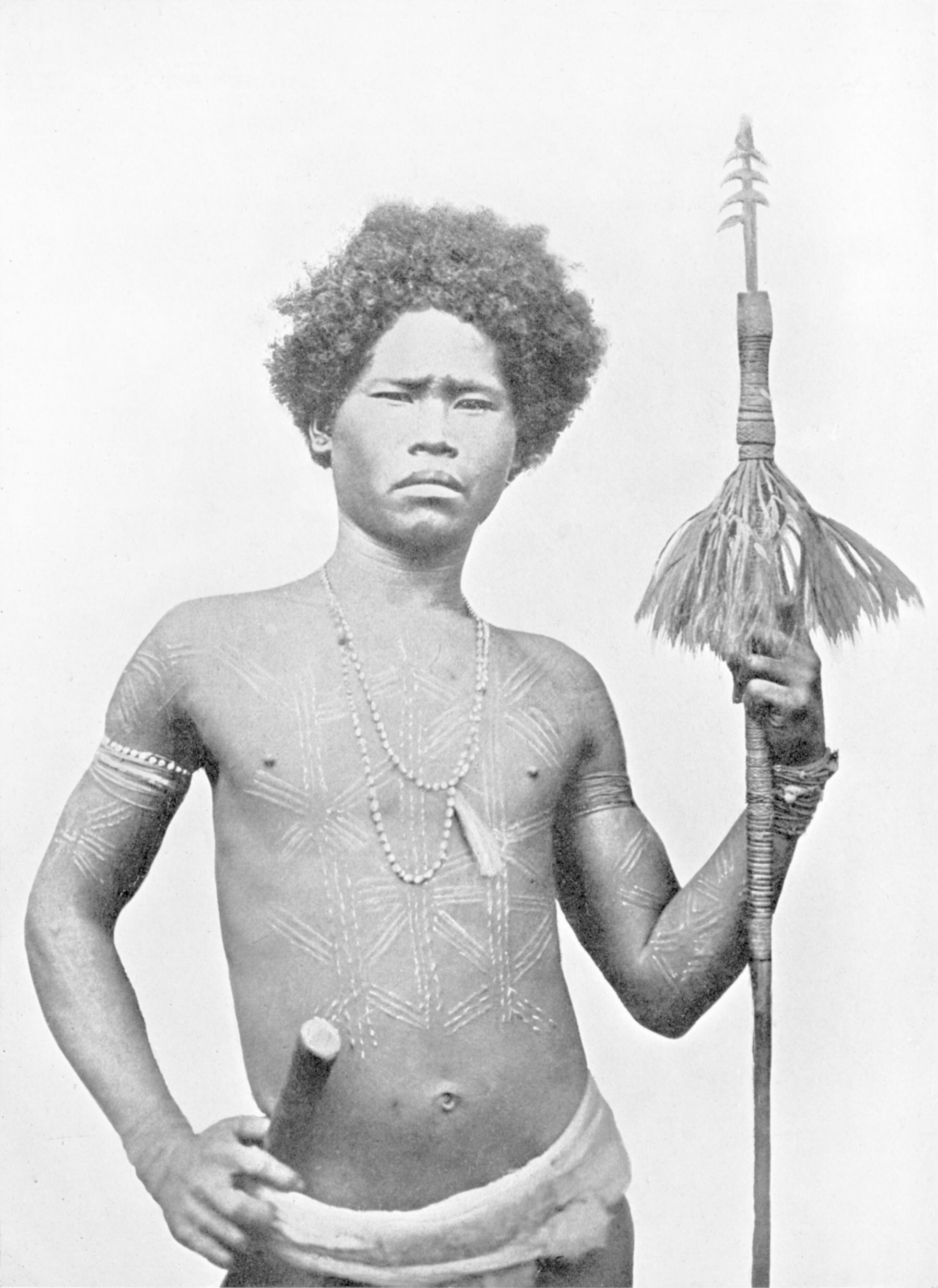
Aeta man from the island of Luzon with a scarified form of indigenous Philippine tattoo, c. 1890s

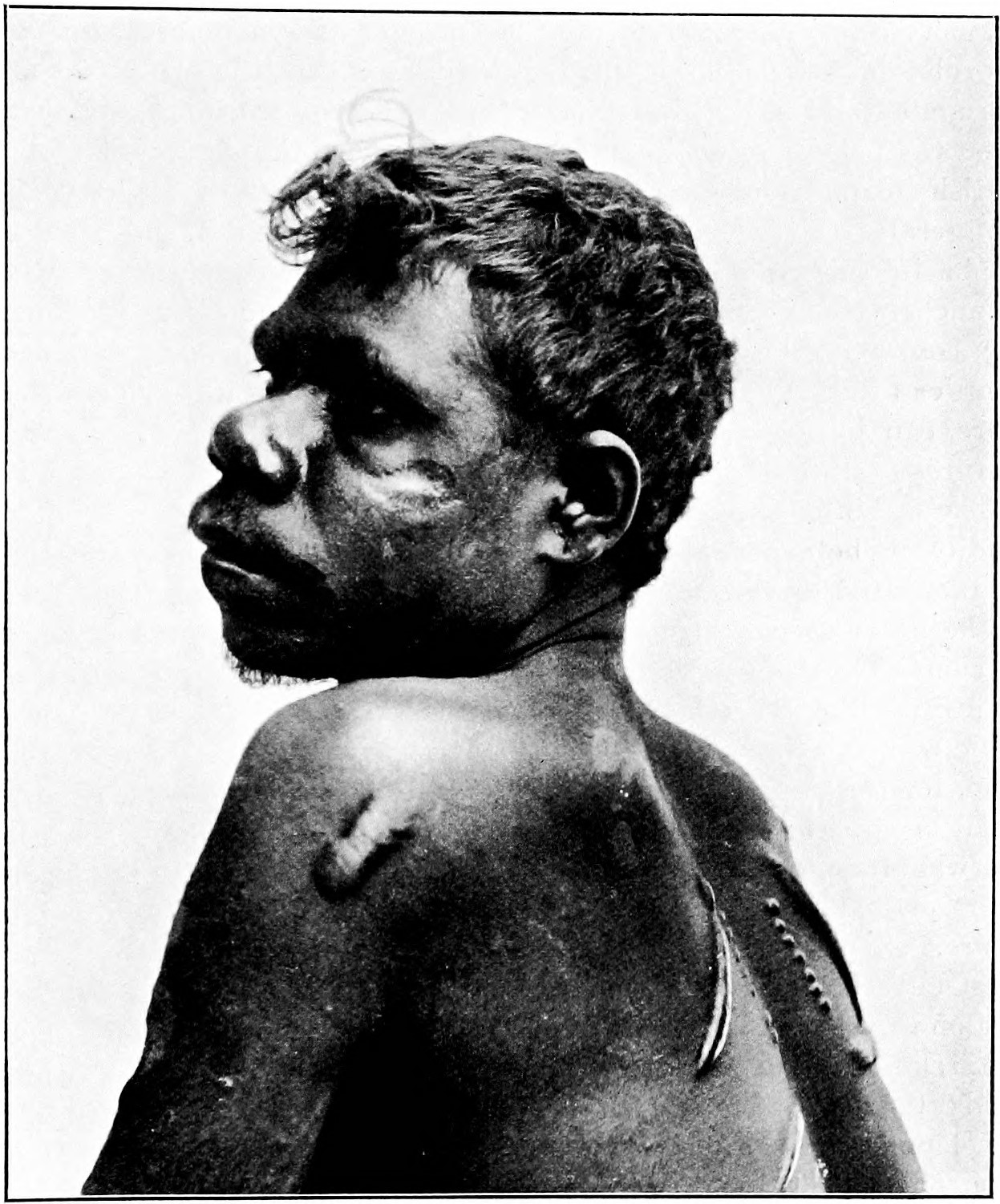
Aboriginal Australian with scarification of the back, 1911

Scarification has been traditionally practiced by darker skinned cultures, possibly because it is usually more visible on darker skinned people than tattoos. It was common in indigenous cultures of Africa (especially in the west), Melanesia, and Australia. Some indigenous cultures in North America also practiced scarification, including the ancient Maya.

=== Africa ===
In Africa, European colonial governments and European Christian missionaries criminalized and stigmatized the cultural practices of tattooing and scarification; consequently, the practices underwent decline, ended, or continued to be performed as acts of resistance.

Among the ethnic groups in sub-Saharan Africa that traditionally practice scarification are the Gonja, Dagomba, Frafra, Mamprusi, Nanumba, Bali, Tɔfin, Bobo, Montol, Kofyar, Yoruba, and Tiv people of West Africa, and the Dinka, Nuer, Surma, Shilluk, Toposa, Moru, Bondei, Shambaa, Barabaig, and Maasai people of East Africa.

== Reasons ==
Within anthropology, the study of the body as a boundary has been long debated. In 1909, Van Gennep described bodily transformations, including tattooing, scarification, and painting, as rites of passage. In 1963, Lévi-Strauss described the body as a surface waiting for the imprintation of culture. Turner (1980) first used the term "social skin" in his detailed discussion of how Kayapo culture was constructed and expressed through individual bodies. Inscribed skin highlights an issue that has been central to anthropology since its inception: the question of boundaries between the individual and society, between societies, and between representation and experiences.

=== Rites of passage and belonging ===
Traditionally, the most common reason for scarification has been as a rite of passage.

Scarification has been widely used by many West African tribes to mark milestone stages in both men and women's lives, such as puberty and marriage. In many tribes, members unwilling to participate in scarification were generally not included in the group's activities, and are often shunned from their society. According to anthropologist Grace Harris, group members lacking the normal characteristics consistent with the group are not considered as having acquired the full standing as agents in their society; they would also lack the capacity for meaningful behavior, such as greeting, commanding, and stating. Therefore, scarification can transform partial tribe members into "normal" members entirely accepted by the group. Scarification is a form of language not readily expressed, except through extensive and intricate greetings, and gives the ability to communicate fully, which is a key element for being considered as a normal member of the group.

One reason why scarification is used as confirmation of adulthood is how it shows the ability to endure pain. With young men, the endurance of the pain of scarring exhibits strength and discipline, especially in tribes where males have roles as hunters and warriors. A young man who has already experienced the feeling of torn or cut flesh is considered less likely to fear the teeth of a wild animal or the tip of an enemy's spear. In Ethiopia and Zambia, elaborate scarification is often done on women at puberty, used to denote a willingness to be a mother. The markings show that she can stand the pain of childbirth, as well as being an indication of her emotional maturity.

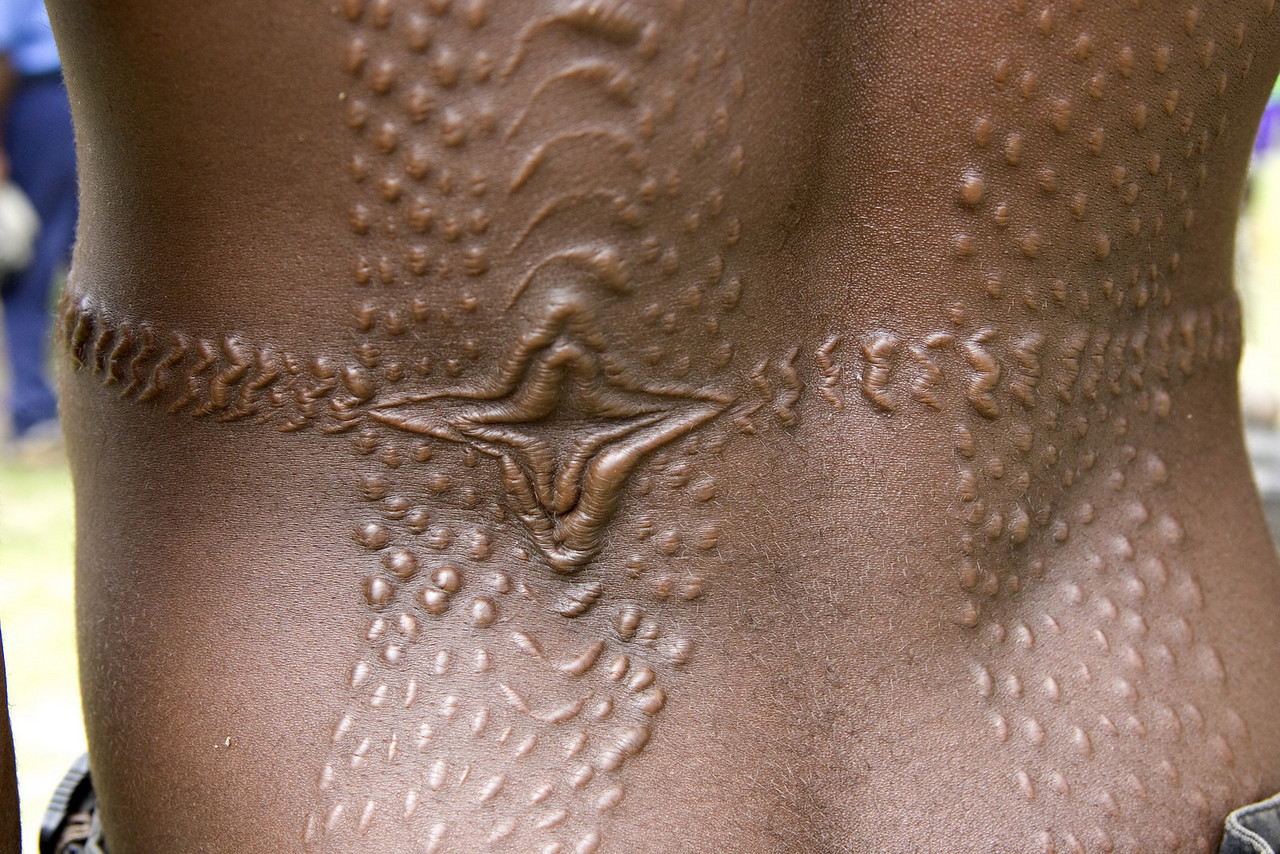
Tribal crocodile scarification done near the Sepik River in Papua New Guinea

Some of these rites of passage have spiritual or religious roots, such young boys in the Chambri tribe of Papua New Guinea undergo scarification resembling crocodile scales to mark their transition into manhood, a ritual which stems from the belief that humans evolved from crocodiles.

In Ethiopia, Suri men scar their bodies to show that they have killed someone from an enemy tribe; the Mursi practice scarification for largely aesthetic reasons in order to attract the opposite sex and enhance the tactile experience of sex. The Ekoi of Nigeria believe that the scars serve, on their way to the afterlife, as money.

=== Identity ===
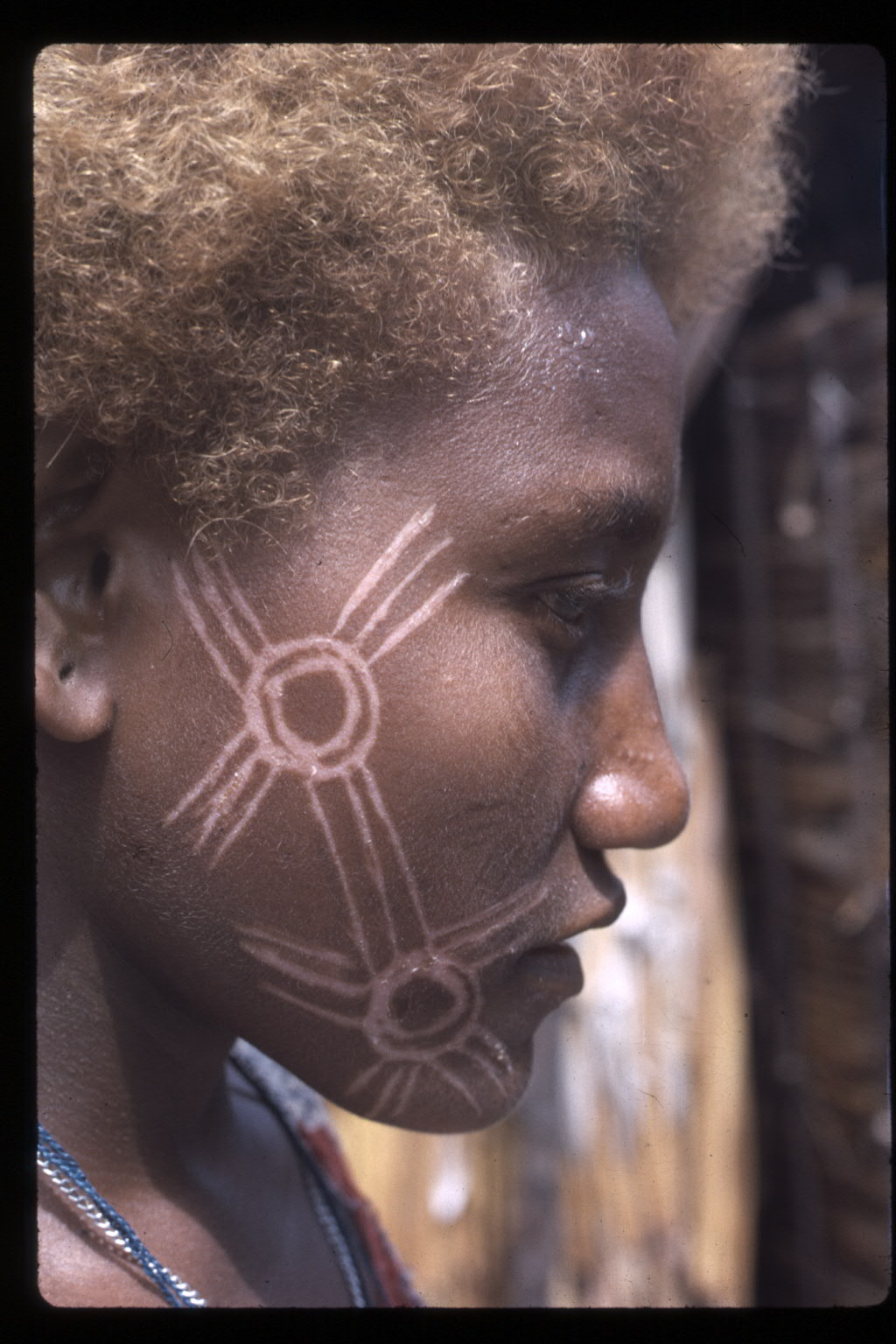
Scarifications on this child's face show his clan membership.

Scarification can be used to transmit complex messages about identity; such permanent body markings may emphasize fixed social, political, and religious roles. Tattoos, scars, brands, and piercings, when voluntarily acquired, are ways of showing a person's autobiography on the surface of the body to the world.

Scarification can also help change status from victim to survivor. These individuals pass through various kinds of ritual death and rebirth, and redefine the relationship between self and society through the skin.

Many people in certain regions of Africa who have "markings" can be identified as belonging to a specific tribe or ethnic group. Some of the tribes in Northern Ghana who use the markings are the Gonjas, Nanumbas, Dagombas, Frafras and Mamprusis.

=== Medicinal ===
For the Nuba tribe of Sudan, scars can serve a medicinal purpose; scars above the eyes are believed to improve eyesight, and scars on the temples are believed to help relieve headaches. In some cultures, scarification is used in traditional medicine to treat some illness by inserting medicine (usually herbs or powdered root) under the skin to heal a variety of infections and illnesses such as Malaria.

== Methods ==
Scarification is not a precise practice; variables, such as skin type, cut depth, and how the wound is treated while healing, can make the outcome unpredictable compared to other forms of body modification. A method that works on one person may not work on another. The scars tend to spread as they heal, so final designs are usually simple, the details being lost during healing.

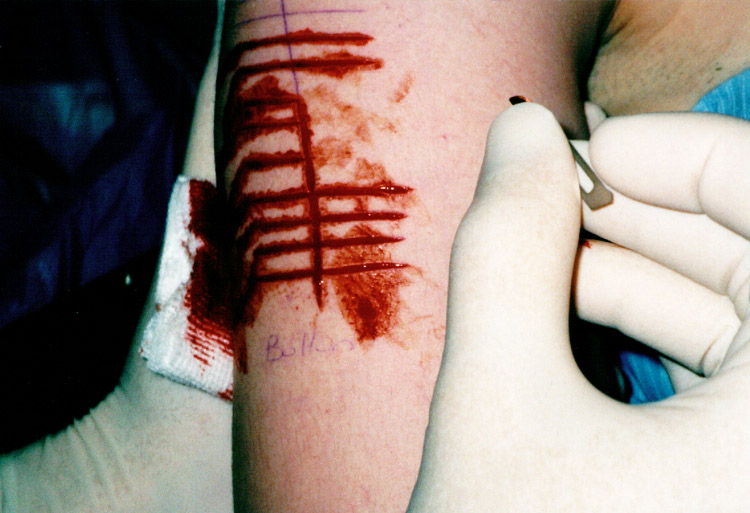
Scarification being created

Some common scarification techniques include:

Ink rubbing
Tattoo ink (or similar agent) is rubbed into a fresh cut to add color or extra visibility to the scar. Most of the ink remains in the skin as the cut heals. This was how tattoos were initially done before the use of needles to inject ink.
Skin removal/skinning
Skin removal allows for larger markings than simple cutting. The skin is raised with a hook or edged thorn and removed with a razor blade. This process can take many hours, and often requires repeated removal of scabs for best visibility of the scars.
Packing
An inert material such as clay or ash is packed into the wound; massive hypertrophic scars are formed during healing as the wound pushes out the substance that had been inserted into the wound. Inflammatory substances can be used to improve keloid formation.

== Dangers ==
Scarification produces harm and trauma to the skin. Infection is common when tools are not sterilised properly. Scarification has been linked to the spread of HIV/AIDS and Hepatitis C when tools are shared between people. Body modification artists may have less experience with scarification, perhaps due to lower demand. When not desired, keloid scars may be an additional complication, although there are emerging treatment strategies for them.

== See also ==
- Body modification
- Dueling scar
- Tattoo
