= Kurgwi =

- Town
- Location within Nigeria
- Coordinates: 8°46′N 9°18′E
- Country: Nigeria
- State: Plateau State
- LGA: Qua'an Pan
- Elevation: 218 m (715 ft)
- Time zone: UTC+1 (WAT)

Kurgwi is a town in the Middle belt of Nigeria.It is found in Qua'an pan Local Government Area of Plateau State. The town sits along the Shendam-Lafia highway in the southern part of plateau state.

== Education ==
The town contains numerous secondary and primary schools, as well as the College of Arts, Sciences and Technology (CAST) which is located in the town and has led to the development of modern infrastructures which was not present in the town before the coming of the tertiary institution.
