= Hasha =

Hasha may be,

- Hasha language, Nigeria
- Eddie Hasha
