= Cicatrization =

Cicatrization, also spelled cicatrisation (from Latin cicatrix, meaning "scar"), is the contraction of fibrous tissue formed at a wound site by fibroblasts, reducing the size of the wound while distorting tissue. It may refer to:

- The process of a wound healing to produce scar tissue
- Scarification, a form of body modification that uses cicatrization to create patterns on the skin
