= Nisam language =

Unattested language of Nigeria

Nisam
- Nince
- (unattested)
- Native to: Nigeria
- Region: Kaduna State
- Native speakers: 1 (2005)
- Language family: Niger–Congo?: Atlantic–Congo; Benue–Congo; Plateau; (unclassified); Nisam

Language codes
- ISO 639-3: None (mis)
- Glottolog: None

Nisam (Nince) is a presumed Plateau language of Nigeria once spoken in Nince village, Kaduna State. Today, Nince village is a Nandu-speaking locality. One speaker named Danladi Nince, was reported in 2005, but he denied any knowledge of Nisam.

== See also ==
- Akpondu language
- Nigbo language
