= Nigbo language =

Nigerian language

Nigbo
- (unattested)
- Native to: Nigeria
- Region: Nigbo, Kaduna State
- Extinct: after 2005
- Language family: Niger–Congo?: Atlantic–Congo; Benue–Congo; Plateau; Alumic; Nigbo

Language codes
- ISO 639-3: None (mis)
- Glottolog: None

Nigbo is an extinct Plateau language of Nigeria. It was spoken near Agameti on the Fadan Karshi-Wamba road near Sanga LGA, Kaduna State. The language, listed in Blench (2012) and (2019), is not reported in Ethnologue or Glottolog. It is presumably an Alumic language based on its proximity to Akpondu, a language closely related to Alumu and Tesu.

The extinct languages Akpondu and Babur (Bəbər) were also spoken in nearby villages of Akpondu and Babur, respectively.

== See also ==
- Nisam language
- Akpondu language
