= Qua'an Pan =

- LGA
- Interactive map of Qua'an Pan
- Location in Nigeria
- Coordinates: 8°48′N 9°09′E
- Country: Nigeria
- State: Plateau State
- Headquarters: Baap (Ba'ap)

Area
  - Total: 2,478 km^{2} (957 sq mi)

Population (2006 census)
  - Total: 196,929
  - Density: 79.47/km^{2} (205.8/sq mi)
- Time zone: UTC+1 (WAT)
- 3-digit postal code prefix: 934
- ISO 3166 code: NG.PL.QP

Qua'an Pan is a Local Government Area in Plateau State, Nigeria. Its headquarters are in the town of Baap (or Ba'ap).

It has an area of 2,478 km^{2} and a population of 196,929 at the 2006 census. It is the fifth largest Local Government in the state based on Population.

The postal code of the area is 934.

== History ==
Qua'an Pan Local Government was carved out of Shendam Local Government on 3 May 1989, by the Ibrahim Babangida regime. Qua'an Pan has two major tribes, the Pan and the Goemai.

The Pan people of Qua’an Pan are descended from Daffiar who migrated from parts unknown to present day Qua’an Pan. In the course of Daffiar’s migration, he eventually settled atop a hill in present day Koffiar. His offspring decided to continue the migration in search of arable lands on the plains below the hill. They settled in various areas including present day Doka and Kwa. In the course of the migration, one of the Daffier’s children got tired at a certain location and declared "Dum mak", which means, "the journey is enough" in the local dialect. This formed the basis of the name of present day Doemak. Daffiar also had a pair of twins who continued migrating and eventually settled in present day Namu. This is why Namu is known as Jep Jan, which means twins in the local dialect.

The Pan people were formerly known as the Kofyar, a name derived from the ancestor Daffiar. In the Pan language, kop refers to the place where one once lived, and da is simply a masculine prefix. Daffiar's home would originally have been called kop-fiar, or Kofyar. Their history, culture, and agriculture have been the subject of extensive research and writing by Robert Netting, Glenn Davis Stone, and M. Priscilla Stone.

== Climate ==
In Qua'an Pan Local Government Area, the year-round heat is accompanied by a partly cloudy dry season and an uncomfortable wet season. The average annual temperature is seldom lower or higher than 2 °C (35 °F) or 36 °C (97 °F).

== Geography ==
Qua'an Pan is located in the Southern region of Plateau state. The Local Government is bordered to the North by Bokkos, Mangu and Pankshin Local Governments. To the East by Shendam Local Government and to the West and South by Nasarawa State. The topography of the LGA is made up primarily of hills and rocks. The LGA's average humidity is reported to be 52%, while the average wind speed in the region is 11 km/h or 6.8 mph.

== Governance ==
Qua'an Pan has eight districts, namely: Bwall, Doemak, Dokan Kasuwa (Jagatnoeng), Kwa, Kwalla (Kwagallak), Kwande (Moekwo), Kwang and Namu (Jepjan). The LG headquarters is at Ba'ap. The LGA is under the Plateau South Senatorial District and Mikang/Qua'an Pan/Shendam Federal Constituency. At the state level, it is divided into Qua'an Pan North and Qua'an Pan South State Constituencies.

== Political structure ==
Qua'an Pan has 166 polling units, and 20 electoral wards consisting of 11 federal and 9 state wards. The electoral wards are: Doemak-Geochim, Doemak-Koplong, Dokan Kasuwa, Kwa, Kwang, Bwall, Kurgwi, Kwalla Moeda, Kwalla Yitla’ar, Kwagar, Latok, Lankaku/Kwari, Lardang, Luukwo, Njak-Shindai, Dokan Kasuwa West, Janta-Aningo, Kurgwi West and Namu.

== Leadership ==
The past chairpersons of Qua'an Pan Local Government are presented in the table below:

Name	Years in Office
John Diyong	1980-1983
Silas Dachor	1989-1990
Daniel Daniang	1990-1994
Cyril Yilyap Longpuaan	1994-1996
Clement Wubang	1996
Yusuf Agyo	1996-1997
Sani Mohammed	1998-1999
Chindo Dafat	1999-2002
Linus Njin	2002-2003
Danjuma Daniel	2004-2006
Mohammed Idi Bello	2006-2007
Emmanuel Tuang	2007-2008
Theophilus Dakas Shan	2009-2013
Vou D. Dido	2013-2014
Theophilus Dakas Shan	2014-2015
Andrew Yenkwo	2015-2017
Joe Y. Homsuk	2017-2018
Isaac Kwallu	2018-2020
Abdulmalik Mongul	2020-2021
Ernest Abner Da’a	2021-2023
Christopher Audu Manship	2023 onwards

== Traditional institutions ==
The traditional council of Qua'an Pan is made of three Chiefdoms, namely: Kwo Chiefdom headed by the Long Kwo, Miskoom Yahaya Kwande, Namu (Jap Jan) Chiefdom headed by the Long Jan, Miskoom Safiyanu Allahnana Magaji III and Pan Chiefdom which is headed by the Long Pan who doubled as the President of the Qua'an Pan Traditional Council. The President of the council is whoever holds the title of the Long Pan, who serves as paramount ruler of the Pan people. The Long Pan is a First Class chief and the chief custodian of the Pan culture. The Long Pan is selected from any of the district heads of the six Pan Districts through voting by Pan Chiefdom Kingmakers. HRH Emmanuel Dabang, formerly district head of Dokan Kasuwa, served as Long Pan until his death. On 7 October 2026, the Plateau State Governor installed Miskagam Jerome Goewam Leklak II as the new Long Pan. The district heads are listed below:

District	District Head
Bwall	Jerome Leklat II (elected and installed as present Long Pan)
Doemak	Cosmos Ndelong
Dokan Kasuwa (Jagatnoeng)	Emmanuel Dabang (late Long Pan)
Kwa	Ignatius Didel
Kwalla (Kwagallak)	John Danladi Dagan (Acting)
Kwang	Davek Naron

== Culture ==
There are two major tribes in Qua'an Pan which are the Pan (formerly the Kofyar) and the Goemai. Various dialects are spoken in the area which include Mernyang, Doemak, Bwall, Jagatnoeng, Kwagallak and Goemai. Other minor dialects include the Nteng, Garam and the Njak. Qua'an also celebrates numerous cultural days and festivals. These include: Pantong, Waptoer, Shikam, Doemak Day and Pan Cultural Day.

== Tourism ==
The Pandam Game Reserve is located in Namu, Qua'an Pan. The tourist attraction has a diverse collection of exotic animals and plants. There is also the famous Lardang cave located in Kwa. The Latok waterfalls in Doemak that slowly runs all year round. Natures beauty is also expressed in the form of the range of sloping hills bordering the northern part of Qua'an Pan.

== Occupation ==
The people of Qua'an Pan are predominantly farmers and also engage in other trades like, blacksmithing, metal works, hunting, trading and fishing.

== Economic activity ==
The main crops cultivated in commercial quantity include Yam, Cassava, Rice, Groundnuts, Guinea Corn, Beans, Palm Oil, Shea Butter, Groundnut, Bambarram nut and Olive Oil. Qua'an Pan has numerous large markets which operate on market days which vary between districts.

District	Market Day
Bwall	Tuesday
Doemak	Saturday
Dokan Kasuwa (Jagatnoeng)	Tuesday
Kwa	Thursday
Kwalla (Kwagallak)	Tuesday
Kwande (Moekwo)	Thursday
Kwang	Wednesday
Namu (Jepjan)	Friday
Pandam	Monday

== Localities ==
- Kurgwi
