= Nteng language =

West Chadic language

Nteng
- Native to: Nigeria
- Region: Plateau State
- Native speakers: 2,000 (2017)
- Language family: Afro-Asiatic: Chadic; West Chadic; Bole–Angas; Angas (A.3); Nteng

Language codes
- ISO 639-3: nqt
- Glottolog: nucl1698
- ELP: Nteng

Nteng is a West Chadic language spoken in Plateau State, Nigeria. Nteng is spoken in the villages of Nteng, Geer, Ɗok, Kelaghal, Lool, Kwaki, Jekmorop, and Gorom, with Gorom being a primarily Bwal-speaking village. Roger Blench (2017) estimates that there are 2,000 speakers as of 2017.

Although Nteng is most closely related to the Pan cluster of languages, it has also been influenced by Mushere.

== Geographical distribution ==
Nteng is spoken in Nteng village and seven other villages of Qua'an Pan Local Government Area, Plateau State, Nigeria. Besides Nteng village, the other Nteng-speaking villages are Gyeer, Ɗoop, Kelaghan, Loon, Kwakii, Zhep Morop, and Gorom. (Gorom is the only village that is currently listed in maps; Gorom is also predominant a Bwall-speaking village.) Some village names and their phonetic pronunciations in IPA:

Name	IPA
Ɗoop	ɗɔ̄ ɔ́p
Gorom	ɡɔ́ɾɔ̄m
Gyeer	ɡʲɛ̄ ɛ́ɾ
Kәlaghan	kә̄lɑ̄ɣɑ̄n
Kwakii	kʷɑ̄ːkīː
Loon	lɔ́ːn
Zhep Morop	ʒɛ̀pmɔ̄ɾɔ̄p
