= Birgit Hellwig =

German linguist

Birgit Hellwig is a German linguist specializing in African and Papuan languages. She is professor of general linguistics at the University of Cologne.

== Education ==
Hellwig studied African linguistics at the University of Bayreuth and the University of Hamburg. In 1998 she took up a doctoral position at the Max Planck Institute for Psycholinguistics in Nijmegen, where her doctorate was awarded in 2001. She remained in Nijmegen working at the Language Archive until 2003. Between 2003 and 2005 she carried out postdoctoral research at the School of Oriental and African Studies in London, and from 2006 to 2008 at La Trobe University in Melbourne; during this time she collaborated with the Department of Linguistics at the University of Khartoum.

== Career and research ==
In 2008, Hellwig took up a junior professorship in language documentation at the University of Erfurt. In 2010 she returned to La Trobe University, this time as a Senior Research Fellow at the Centre for Research on Language Diversity. Since 2014 she has been professor for language documentation and psycholinguistics at the University of Cologne.

Hellwig conducts research into language documentation, language acquisition, linguistic typology, and anthropological linguistics. She has worked on a variety of languages of Africa, including Goemai and other Chadic languages, Katla, Tabaq, and Zaghawa, as well as the Qaqet language of Papua New Guinea. A major focus of her research has been creating corpora for all of the above languages, based on original fieldwork. Her research has received funding from the Endangered Languages Documentation Programme, the Australian Research Council, the German Research Foundation, and the Volkswagen Foundation.

== Awards and honours ==
In 2020, Hellwig was elected ordinary member of the Academia Europaea.

== Selected publications ==
- Hellwig, Birgit. 2006. Serial verb constructions in Goemai. In Alexandra Y. Aikhenvald & R. M. W. Dixon (eds.), Serial verb constructions: a cross-linguistic typology, 88–107. Oxford: Oxford University Press.
- Hellwig, Birgit. 2006. Field semantics and grammar-writing: stimuli-based techniques and the study of locative verbs. In Felix K. Ameka, Alan Dench & Nicholas Evans (eds.), Catching language: the standing challenge of grammar-writing, 321–358. Berlin: Walter de Gruyter.
- Hellwig, Birgit. 2010. Meaning and translation in linguistic fieldwork. Studies in Language 34 (4), 802–831. doi:10.1075/sl.34.4.02hel
- Hellwig, Birgit. 2011. A grammar of Goemai. Berlin: Walter de Gruyter. ISBN 9783110238297
- Hellwig, Birgit. 2019. A grammar of Qaqet. Berlin: Mouton de Gruyter. ISBN 9783110613346
