= April 2022 Benue State killings =

Killings in Benue State, Nigeria

April 2022 Benue State Killings
- Part of Herder-farmer conflict in Nigeria
- Location: Villages in and around Guma LGA, Benue State, Nigeria
- Date: 11–12 April 2022
- Deaths: 25+
- Injuries: 10+
- Perpetrator: Fulani herdsmen

On 12 April 2022, armed herdsmen attacked several villages in Benue State, Nigeria, killing over 25 people and injuring many more.

== Background ==
Nigeria has been facing a conflict between Christian farmers and Fulani herdsmen in the center and northern parts of the country since 1999. The fighting has been a cycle, and many attacks are often against innocent herders or farmers as reprisal and retaliation attacks against others. On 10 March, Fulani herdsmen attacked the village of Ahentse, hometown of Benue State governor Samuel Ortom. Five people were killed in the attacks. Further attacks in Guma LGA continued throughout March and early April.

== Attacks ==
The attacks targeted villages in three LGAs. The first attack was in the village of Semaka around 9pm on 11 April, and killed five Christian civilians and injured over ten others. The perpetrators fled on bikes, and then attacked the villages of Tyotugh and Gaambetiev in Guma LGA. Nine people were killed in Tyotugh, and fifteen in Gaambetiev, although the exact death toll is not known due to some people being killed after fleeing into the forest. One of the bodies was Chief Unongo Shaayange of the Logo LGA. The perpetrators were not immediately caught.

== Aftermath ==
In a protest against the perpetrators, angered civilians from the attacked villages stacked the bodies of the slain villagers on the Makurdi-Gboko highway and blocked traffic. The confrontation ended after an intervention by the Benue State Police Commissioner.

Governor Samuel Ortom the next day reiterated statements for civilians to defend themselves against bandits and herdsmen. The Security Adviser to Ortom, Lt. Col. Paul Hemba, stated that the death toll was likely to increase as bodies were still being found.

Twelve kidnappers were caught in January 2023, alleged to be involved with the 12 April killings.
