= Toro language =

Plateau language of Nigeria

Toro
- Turkwam
- Native to: Nigeria
- Region: Nassarawa State
- Native speakers: (3,900 cited 2000)
- Language family: Niger–Congo?: Atlantic–Congo; Benue–Congo; Plateau; Alumic; Alumu–Toro; Toro

Language codes
- ISO 639-3: tdv
- Glottolog: toro1249

Toro, also known as Turkwam, is a Plateau language of Nigeria. It has lost the nominal affix system characteristic of the Niger–Congo family.

Toro is spoken in Turkwam village, located northeast of Wamba. The language is still vital, with no immediate endangerment. There are about 3,000 to 4,000 people in Turkwam village. The plural form of 'Toro people' is à-Toro-mbò). The Toro people culturally identify with the Kantana people, who speak a Jarawan Bantu language.
