= Koenoem language =

Afro-Asiatic language

Koenoem
- Native to: Nigeria
- Region: Plateau State
- Native speakers: (3,000 cited 1973)
- Language family: Afro-Asiatic: Chadic; West Chadic; Bole–Angas; Angas (A.3); Koenoem

Language codes
- ISO 639-3: kcs
- Glottolog: koen1239
- ELP: Koenoem

Koenoem is an Afro-Asiatic language spoken in Plateau State, Nigeria. It is spoken in about 6 villages east of the Panyam-Shendam road.
