= Sambe language =

Extinct Plateau language of Nigeria

Sambe
- Native to: Nigeria
- Region: Kaduna State
- Native speakers: 2 (2005)
- Language family: Niger–Congo?: Atlantic–Congo; Benue–Congo; Plateau; Alumic; Hasha–Sambe; Sambe

Language codes
- ISO 639-3: xab
- Glottolog: samb1307
- ELP: Sambe

Sambe is a presumably extinct Plateau language of Nigeria once spoken in the village of the same name. The Sambe people have shifted to Ninzo.

Sambe is unusual in contrasting /k͡p/ and /k͡pʷ/, a rare distinction in the world’s languages. For example,

/k͡pùk͡pʷɛ̀/ "cough"
/kə́k͡pɛ/ "choose"
