= Pyapun language =

Afro-Asiatic language

Pyapun
- Native to: Nigeria
- Region: Plateau State
- Native speakers: (17,000 cited 2000)
- Language family: Afro-Asiatic: Chadic; West Chadic; Bole–Angas; Angas (A.3); Pyapun

Language codes
- ISO 639-3: pcw
- Glottolog: pyap1239

Pyapun is an Afro-Asiatic language spoken in Plateau State, Nigeria. It is spoken in about 10 villages east of the Panyam-Shendam road.
