= Alumic languages =

Alumic
- Geographic distribution: Nigeria
- Linguistic classification: Niger–Congo?: Atlantic–Congo; Benue–Congo; Plateau; Alumic

Language codes
- ISO 639-3: –
- Glottolog: alum1250

The four scattered and poorly attested Alumic languages form a branch of the Plateau languages of central Nigeria.

== Classification ==
The following classification is taken from Blench (2008). The languages are not closely related and are morphologically quite diverse due to different contact situations; given the poor state of their description, their relationship is provisional.

- Alumic
  - Alumu‑Toro
    - - Alumu-Tesu
      - Akpondu
    - Toro (Turkwam)
  - Hasha‑Sambe
    - Sambe
    - Hasha (Yashi)

Ethnologue scatters these languages throughout Plateau: Hasha and Sambe with Eggon (Southern branch), and Alumu–Tesu and Toro as two independent branches.

Blench (2019) also includes Nigbo (extinct).

== Names and locations ==
Below is a list of language names, populations, and locations from Blench (2019).

Language	Cluster	Alternate spellings	Own name for language	Endonym(s)	Other names (location-based)	Speakers	Location(s)
Akpondu (extinct)			Akpondu			1 (2005). The last speaker was only a remember and can only recall fragmentary vocabulary	Plateau State
Sambe			Sambe	Sambe		2 (2005)	Kaduna State
Alumu-Tәsu cluster	Alumu-Tәsu	Arum–Chessu					Nasarawa State, Akwanga LGA
Alumu	Alumu-Tәsu	Arum	Alumu			Seven villages. ca. 5000 (Blench 1999)	
Tәsu	Alumu-Tәsu	Chessu				Two villages. ca. 1000 (Blench 1999)	
Hasha		Iyashi, Yashi				400 (SIL); 3000 (Blench est. 1999)	Nasarawa State, Akwanga LGA
Toro				Tɔrɔ	Turkwam	6,000 (1973 SIL). 2000 (Blench 1999). The Toro people live in one large village, Turkwam, some two km. southeast of Kanja on the Wamba-Fadan Karshi road	Nasarawa State, Akwanga LGA
Nigbo (extinct)						near Agameti on the Fadan Karshi-Wamba road.	
