= Ahwai language =

Plateau language of Nigeria

Ahwai
- Ndunic
- indùn, hanyeŋ, ìʃákárá
- Region: Nigeria
- Ethnicity: Ahwai people
- Native speakers: 15,000 (2006)
- Language family: Niger–Congo?: Atlantic–Congo; Benue–Congo; Plateau; Ahwai
- Dialects: Ndun; Nyeng; Shakara

Language codes
- ISO 639-3: nfd
- Glottolog: ahwa1235

Nandu
- Person: aner andùn
- People: bener andùn
- Language: indùn

Ningon
- Person: anyeŋ
- People: banyeŋ
- Language: hanyeŋ

Tari
- Person: kùʃákárá
- People: úʃàkárá
- Language: ìʃákárá

Ahwai, also called the Ndunic languages (formerly Nandu-Tari), is a Plateau language cluster spoken to the southwest of Fadan Karshi in Sanga LGA, Kaduna State, Nigeria. Most villages are located at the foot of the Ahwai Mountains in Kaduna State.

== Dialects ==
There are three mutually intelligible dialects:

- Ndun (Nandu), spoken just to the southwest of the Ahwai Mountains.
- Nyeng (Ningon), spoken just to the northwest of the Ahwai Mountains. First documented in 2003.
- Shakara (Tari), spoken just to the southeast of the Ahwai Mountains.

Blench (2008) classified them as distinct Ndunic languages. However, that same year Ethnologue merged them as a single language.

Ahwai is a self-designated term used to refer to speakers of all three Ndunic languages.

=== Ndun ===
Ndun is also known by the Hausa name Nandu. Ndun villages are Ànkpòŋ, Anfufalǐm, Ŋ̀bòk, Ànkàrà, Bányìn, and Ungwar Rimi.

In Nince village, Kaduna State, the Nisam (Nince) people have all shifted to Ndun. The Nisam language remains undocumented.

=== Nyeng ===
Nyeng is spoken by about 2,000 speakers in Adu and other villages in Kaduna State, Nigeria. The Nyeng people used to live on the hill of ifyal anyeŋ. Today, their villages are:

Nyeng name	Hausa name
Adu	Ningon Kirya
Pɔ̀hɔ́k	Ungwan Giginya
Pok Kyɔ́	Ungwan Dakaci
Ungwan Rimi	Ningon Titi

A word list of Nyeng was collected by Roger Blench and Barau Kato in 2003.

=== Shakara ===
The main settlements of the Shakara are Jije Fyal, Nggwakum, Akayi, Apɔhɔt, Telehwe, Kobo, Koba, Nggwa Dauda, Nggwa Mangoro, Nggwa Igyan, Barib, and formerly Nggwa Yiri (now uninhabited).

== Names and locations ==
Below is a list of Ndunic language names, populations, and locations from Blench (2019).

Language	Cluster	Alternate spellings	Own name for language	Endonym(s)	Other names (location-based)	Other names for language	Speakers	Location(s)
Ndun-Nyeng-Shakara cluster	Ndun-Nyeng-Shakara				Ahwai [recently adopted name for the three languages]			
Ndun	Ndun-Nyeng-Shakara	Nandu						
Nyeng	Ndun-Nyeng-Shakara				Ningon			
Shakara	Ndun-Nyeng-Shakara		ìShákárá	sg. kùShákárá pl. úShákárá		Tari	Shakara 3000 (Blench est. 2003)	Kaduna State, a line of villages 7 km. due west of Mayir on the Fadan Karshe-Wamba road
