= Yandang people =

Nigerian tribe

Yandang people are one of the tribes in Nigeria. They are located in Mayo-belwa in Adamawa state and Lau, Ardo Kola, Gasol in Taraba state.

== Origin ==
Yandang people and the Mumuye are believed to have come from Egypt and they settled in Yoro before the final migration to their current location; Adamawa and Taraba States. The ancestral homeland of the Yandang people is Gorobi in Adamawa State. A beautiful landscape surrounded by mountains and hills that shielded them from slave trade raiders till the twentieth century. In Gorobi, the Yandang people is divided into seventeen clans. The seventeen clans are also subdivided into houses and sub-clans.

== Language ==
The Yandang people speaks Yendang Language

== Marriage culture ==
In Yandang people's culture, just like other African cultures, parental consent is the most important thing. When a man shows interest in a lady, he gives her a "Mou" a traditional and invaluable iron use for making hoes and weapons. If the parents accepts the Mou, then they have consented to the proposal and If otherwise, they have rejected the proposal.

After the consent of the lady's parent, the fiancé is expected to bring his family to see the lady's parent and to also discuss the issue "hinlengki"and "wah-konag" which are the bride price and the building of a hut for the mother in law or the payment of equivalent price. There are other things required for the marriage like yams, beer, guinea corn, hoes, “kansuki (a rod held by women when dancing), a fully grown ram and two he-goats.

== The Marrah System ==
Unlike most of the Nigerian tribe that believes that children belongs to the paternal family, Yandang people believe that the first child belongs to the mother and her family. A Marrah child is expected to trace his/her lineage matrilineally.

== Traditional names ==
The traditional Names given to Yandang people are based on the circumstances surrounding the birth of the child. When a child is born during an unproductive year, he/she is named Bonzinbaba which means "no more guinea corn". When a child is born when good thing happened, he/she is named Tansiye which means good news

== Religion ==
Traditionally, the Yandang people worship their sun god Rubi and his son VelaRubi alongside the spirits of the dead ancestors.

== Occupation ==
The Yandang people are mainly farmers who grow guinea corn and they also rear farm animals.

== Festivals ==
=== Herra yawhithi or Yandang Day ===
This is a yearly festival that is done at the mountain of their ancestors to pray for a fruitful season. It is usually done at the beginning of raining season which mostly falls in May.

=== Bhoki tuka Festival ===
This is a circumcision festival that is done every four years to made young boys into adulthood.
