= Pan language =

Afro-Asiatic language

Kofyar
- Pan
- Native to: Nigeria
- Region: Plateau State
- Ethnicity: Kofyar
- Native speakers: (110,000 cited 2000)
- Language family: Afro-Asiatic: Chadic; West Chadic; Bole–Angas; Angas (A.3); Kofyar

Language codes
- ISO 639-3: kwl
- Glottolog: kofy1242

Pan is an Afro-Asiatic dialect cluster spoken in Plateau State, Nigeria.

== Dialects ==
Dialects are Bwol, Dimmuk (Doemak), Gworam, Jipal, Kofyar (Kwong), Kwagallak (Kwolla), and Mirriam (Mernyang).

Blench (2019) lists the following language varieties in the Pan cluster. Village locations are cited by Blench (2019) from Hon, et al. (2014).

- Mernyang: spoken in Dokan Kasuwa, Dokan Tofa, Kwaning, Laardang, Kwang, Kwa, Miket villages
- Doemak: spoken in Kofyar Doemak, Goechim, Ba'ap, Kopar, Doemak villages
- Tèŋ (Teng): spoken in Nteng, Gyeer, Ɗoop, Kelaghan, Loon, Kwakii, Zhep Morop, Gorom villages
- Kwagallak: spoken in Tim, Kopfogon, Chim, Yitiar, Kwoor, Kwalla, Shangfuup, Kopbepang, Moeda villages
- Bwol (Bwall): spoken in Dungras, Nakum, Tanba, Bwall, Goepil villages
- Gworam
- Jipal: spoken in Katul, Kabum, Kanjing, Kaburuk, Shawk, Kaper, rundum, Jipal, Bul, Kwa, Male, Zwakal villages
- Shindai

Note that in the villages names, orthographic oe stands for the mid central vowel ə, a practice that had been adopted by missionaries in the Shendam area during the 1930s, such as Father E. Sirlinger.
