= Tal language =

Afro-Asiatic language

Tal
- Native to: Nigeria
- Region: Plateau State
- Native speakers: (10,000 cited 1973)
- Language family: Afro-Asiatic: Chadic; West Chadic; Bole–Angas; Angas (A.3); Tal

Language codes
- ISO 639-3: tal
- Glottolog: tall1250

Tal is an Afroasiatic language spoken in Plateau State, Nigeria. Tal is spoken in a cluster of 53 villages located east of the Panyam-Shendam road. There are 6 dialects of Tal, namely Bongmuut, Buzuk, Nbaal, Muɗak, Muɗong, and Takong.

Tal is a tonal language, with 3 tone levels (high, mid, and low) and one contour tone (a raised high tone). Tal has twelve contrastive vowels (i, ɛ, ɨ, a, u, ɔ) in 6 short and long pairs.
