= Cakfem-Mushere language =

Afro-Asiatic language

Cakfem-Mushere
- Native to: Nigeria Niger
- Region: Bokkos LGA, Plateau State
- Native speakers: (5,000 cited 1990)
- Language family: Afro-Asiatic: Chadic; West Chadic; Bole–Angas; Angas (A.3); Cakfem-Mushere

Language codes
- ISO 639-3: cky
- Glottolog: cakf1236

Cakfem-Mushere is an Afro-Asiatic language cluster spoken in Bokkos LGA, Plateau State, Nigeria. Dialects are Kadim-Kaban and Jajura. Mutual intelligibility with Mwaghavul and Mupun is high.

Mushere is very close to Mwaghavul and Mupun.

Cakfem has two varieties, namely Outer Cakfem and Inner Cakfem. Outer Cakfem is very similar to Mwaghavul, but Inner Cakfem is more divergent, as Mwaghavul speakers have trouble understanding Inner Cakfem. According to Blench in 2019, the Cakfem people have thirteen villages, with Tim as the main settlement. Hausa is frequently used by the younger generation.
