= Yiwom language =

Chadic (Afro-Asiatic) language

Yiwom
- Gerka
- Pronunciation: [jʷom]
- Native to: Nigeria
- Region: Plateau State
- Native speakers: (14,000 cited 2000)
- Language family: Afro-Asiatic: Chadic; West Chadic; Bole–Angas; Yiwom

Language codes
- ISO 639-3: gek
- Glottolog: yiwo1237

Yiwom (Ywom), also known as Gerka or Gerkawa by the Hausa, is a Chadic (Afro-Asiatic) language spoken in Plateau State, Nigeria.

== Sociolinguistic background ==
Ywom was formerly much more widespread, with Ywom toponyms found in southern Tarok-speaking areas. Roger Blench (2013) reports that Ywom is spoken in Hyel Ywom town and nearby hamlets. Many Ywom speak Jukun and Tarok as additional languages. Due to influence from Plateau languages, Ywom has various phonological features that are considered unusual for a West Chadic language, such as labiovelar consonants.

== Phonology ==
=== Tones ===
According to Blench (2013), high and low tones are phonemic, while mid tones are likely only phonetic, and rising and falling tones appear as a consequence of sequences.

=== Vowels ===
Vowels
	Front	Central	Back
Close	i	ɨ ɨː	u
Close-mid	e eː	ə	o
Open		a aː	

According to Blench (2013), [ɯ] appears in a few example words but is likely not phonemic.

=== Consonants ===
Consonants
		Labial	Alveolar	Palatal (–alveolar)	Velar	Labial–velar	Uvular	Glottal
Implosive		ɓ	ɗ					
Plosive	voiceless	p	t		k	kp		ʔ
Plosive	voiced	b	d		ɡ	(ɡb)	ɢ	
Fricative	voiceless	f	s	ʃ				h
Fricative	voiced	v	z	ʒ	(ɣ)			
Nasal		m	n	ɲ	ŋ			
Approximant			l	j		w		
Rhotic			r					

According to Blench (2013):

- There is likely no phonemic contrast between the voiced uvular plosive [ɢ] and voiced velar fricative [ɣ]. The uvular is the orthographic choice.
- The voiced labial–velar plosive [ɡb] is not clearly articulated and appears to be in free variation with the bilabial implosive [ɓ].
- A voiceless dental fricative [θ] appears in a single Jukunoid loan [tìp θɨ́k] to bathe.

Also according to Blench (2013), initial consonants may be appear with the following secondary articulation or clusters:

- /b ɓ m f v t d j k ɡ/ may be labialized /Cʷ/.
- /k ʃ/ may be palatalized /Cʲ/. Blench groups these with /ɲ/ and calls them palatal consonants; it is not clear from this description if they therefore are realized as palatal released [kʲ ʃʲ] or are true palatal allophones [c ɕ].
- A single case of a labiopalatalized consonant exists in the word [ɡᶣàm] chin. If analyzed instead as an allophonic palatal [ɟ], this would be [ɟʷàm].
- /p b t d k ɡ ɡb/ may appear in rhotic clusters /Cr/.
- /p f t d k/ may appear in lateral clusters /Cl/.

Blench (2013) notes an example of a "problematic sound" from a single word [vʷu] black, which has been reported to have the lower lip vibrating during the fricative. Blench suggests this is likely related to the labiodental flap /ⱱ/ found elsewhere in the region, but notes that more examples are required to determine its status.
