= Hasha language =

Plateau language spoken in Nigeria

Hasha
- Yashi
- hàʃà
- Native to: Nigeria
- Region: Nassarawa State
- Native speakers: (3,000 cited 1999)
- Language family: Niger–Congo?: Atlantic–Congo; Benue–Congo; Plateau; Alumic; Hasha–Sambe; Hasha

Language codes
- ISO 639-3: ybj
- Glottolog: hash1238
- ELP: Hasha

haʃa
- Person: háʃà
- People: háʃa
- Language: hàʃà

Hasha, also known as Yashi, is a Plateau language of Nasarawa State Nigeria. It has an idiosyncratic system of reduplicating the first syllable of noun stems, apparently under the influence of the Chadic language Sha.

Hasha is spoken by about 3,000 people in Kwààn (Yàshì Sarki; Bwora), which is the main settlement, and also in the two nearby villages of Hàshàsu (Yàshì Pá) and Hùsù (Yàshì Madaki; Kusu).
