= Montol language =

Afroasiatic language

Montol
- Tɛɛl
- Native to: Nigeria
- Region: Plateau State
- Native speakers: (22,000 cited 1990)
- Language family: Afro-Asiatic: Chadic; West Chadic; Bole–Angas; Angas (A.3); Montol

Language codes
- ISO 639-3: mtl
- Glottolog: mont1280

Montol is an Afroasiatic language spoken in Plateau State, Nigeria. Its dialects are Baltap-Lalin and Montol. Roger Blench (2017) uses the name Tel or Tɛɛl for Montol, which is sometimes transcribed as Tehl.
