= Kofyar people =

Ethnic group in Nigeria

Kofyar
Total population
- 181,000

Regions with significant populations
- Nigeria

Languages
- Kofyar

Religion
- Traditional African religions

The Kofyar are a population in central Nigeria numbering over 180,000. After several anthropological studies, they provide good illustrations of how colonial authorities become unwittingly enmeshed in local politics; of sustainable subsistence agricultural production in crowded areas; of successful self-directed development of market-oriented agriculture; and of the use of "traditional" cultural resources to prosper in modern Nigeria.

== Colonial history ==
The population known as the Kofyar actually comprises three different "tribes" as designated by British colonial officers: the Doemak (or Dimmuk), Merniang, and Kwalla. However the three groups have a common language, economic pattern, and origin myth, and had formed into a union called the Koffyer Federation in the 1940s; they have therefore been referred to as a single group by anthropologists.

When first encountered by early British colonial authorities, they lived in the rugged hills in the southeastern corner of the Jos Plateau and in settlements around the plateau base. Their subjugation by the British was largely non-violent until 1930, when a young Assistant District Officer named Barlow was killed in the hill village of Latok by a rock thrown at his head. After this the residents of Latok and neighboring villages were forced out of the hills and made to live on the plains below for nine years. In an award-winning study, anthropologist Robert Netting explained how Barlow had been unknowingly used in a local political dispute.

== Culture and agriculture in the Kofyar homeland ==
Robert Netting began anthropological research with the Kofyar in the early 1960s. In the Kofyar homeland population densities were high, approaching 500/km² in many areas. Netting's primary focus was on the Kofyar ecological adaptations, including the highly intensive agriculture being practiced and also the social institutions that were instrumental to sustainability. Much of the land was in annual cultivation, with animal herds providing dung compost for fertilizer, and steep hillsides were intricately terraced. Netting's Hill Farmers of Nigeria, a classic book in the field of cultural ecology, showed how social institutions such as household form and land tenure had adjusted to the intensive cultivation system. Netting compared adaptations of Kofyar and their neighbors to demonstrate Ester Boserup's thesis that agricultural intensification relates to the growth of increasingly dense population and decreasing per capita land area. Kofyar families farmed most intensively close to their homesteads while using less intensive bush and forest fallow systems, which required less investment, on more distant fields. The Kofyar demonstrated a reversion to less labor-intensive long-fallow systems when land became available on the plains south of their traditional region.

In The Agricultural Dilemma: How Not to Feed the World, anthropologist Glenn Stone used the Kofyar agricultural system as an example of productive, innovative, and sustainable agriculture without major reliance on externally purchased inputs.

== Economic and cultural change since the 1960s ==
During the 1950s, the Kofyar began to settle in the fertile plains of the Benue Valley to the south of the Jos Plateau. Pioneering farms there used extensive slash-and-burn methods, but with rising population density and market stimulus, intensive methods were gradually introduced. By the 1980s, Benue Valley Kofyar were producing considerable surpluses of yams, rice, peanuts, pearl millet and sorghum using labor-intensive but generally sustainable methods – an interesting contrast to the externally supported agricultural development schemes in the region, which have generally failed.

As in the homeland, millet beer was found to play a key role not only in daily life but in the organization of agricultural production. The highly productive farming system ran almost entirely on human labor, with little external inputs, and a key strategy for mobilizing local labor was the "mar muos", a festive labor party at which all workers were served generous amounts of millet beer.

Although most Kofyar now live in the Benue Valley (or in cities), the Jos Plateau homeland is still inhabited largely because of the efforts to maintain it as a cultural and economic resource. Many Kofyar who live elsewhere still keep secondary homes in the homeland.

In 1989, a new Local Government Area (LGA) called Qua'an Pan was carved out of the Shendam LGA, the administration of which had been dominated by the neighboring Goemai people. Qua'an Pan LGA is 2,478 km² in size, encompassing the entire Kofyar homeland area in and around the Jos Plateau as well as a substantial area south of Namu where Kofyar have lived and farmed since the 1960s. Many people here now identify as Pan, Doemak or Kwalla.
