= Akpondu language =

Niger-Congo language

Akpondu
- Native to: Nigeria
- Region: Kaduna State
- Native speakers: 1 rememberer (2005)
- Language family: Niger–Congo?: Atlantic–Congo; Benue–Congo; Plateau; Alumic; Alumu-Akpondu; Akpondu

Language codes
- ISO 639-3: None (mis)
- Glottolog: akpo1243

Akpondu is a Plateau language of Nigeria once spoken in Akpondu village, Kaduna State. The Akpondu people have shifted to Ninzo. Only the numerals have been recorded. The extinct undocumented languages Nigbo and Babur (Bəbər) were also spoken in nearby villages of Nigbo and Babur, respectively.

== Numerals ==
Akpondu numerals were recalled by the village head of Akpondu in 2005. They are:

Numeral	Akpondu	Təsu
one	àɲini	àɲimbere
two	àfi	àhùrwi
three	àtárá	àtaat
four	ànnɛ̀	aanε
five	àtúŋgu	atúŋgú
six	ànar kye	tέrέkífí
seven	ànar aɲini	tέrέkífí naɲí
eight	atar	tsyátsyá
nine	atar kye aɲini	tsyátsyá nanyi
ten	àgùrmabɔ	gòròmàvɔ
eleven	àgùrmabɔ àɲini	gòròmàvɔ hwá nyimbere
