= Mwaghavul language =

Afro-Asiatic language

Mwaghavul
- Native to: Nigeria
- Region: Plateau State
- Native speakers: 150,000 (2016)
- Language family: Afro-Asiatic: Chadic; West Chadic; Bole–Angas; Angas (A.3); Mwaghavul

Language codes
- ISO 639-3: sur
- Glottolog: mwag1236

Mwaghavul (also known as Sura) is an Afro-Asiatic language spoken in Plateau State in central Nigeria and predominantly in Mangu LGA.

Mwaghavul's dialects include Takas. The Mupun people is a related ethnic group.

Mwaghavul has one of the most elaborate systems of logophoricity known in any language.

== Phonology ==
Consonants
		Labial	Alveolar	Postalveolar	Palatal	Velar	Glottal
Plosive/ Affricate	voiceless	p	t	t͡ʃ		k	(ʔ)
Plosive/ Affricate	voiced	b	d	d͡ʒ		g	
Plosive/ Affricate	implosive	ɓ	ɗ				
Fricative	voiceless	f	s	ʃ			h
Fricative	voiced	v	z	ʒ		(ɣ)	
Nasal		m	n	ɲ		ŋ	
Approximant			l		j	w	
Trill			r				

Mwaghavul has 6 vowels: /a, e, i, ɨ, o, u/.

Vowels
	Front	Central	Back
Close	i	ɨ	u
Open	e	a	o
