= Miship language =

Afro-Asiatic language in Nigeria

Miship
- Chip
- Native to: Nigeria
- Region: Plateau State
- Native speakers: (6,000 cited 1976)
- Language family: Afro-Asiatic: Chadic; West Chadic; Bole–Angas; Angas (A.3); Miship

Language codes
- ISO 639-3: mjs
- Glottolog: mish1244

Miship, or Chip, is an Afro-Asiatic language spoken in Plateau State, Nigeria. Doka is a dialect. Blench lists the two dialects Longmaar and Jiɓaam.

The Chip people are found in Pankshin LGA.

== People ==
The Miship people refer to themselves and their homeland as Miship. However, outsiders often incorrectly call both the people and their land “Chip,” a term that has no meaning in the Miship language. The letter C does not exist in the Miship orthography. Consequently, when adapting foreign words that contain the letter C with the sound /tʃ/, Miship naturally renders this sound as SH, pronounced /ʃ/. For example, the typical Miship pronunciation of the English word cheap, /tʃɪp/ is realized as [ʃɪp].

The traditional activities of Miship people included farming, blacksmithing, weaving, carving among others. Palm wine tapping, trading and farming are now the major activities in the Miship land.

Oral tradition states that they migrated from Kanem-Bornu to their present homeland with other tribes, Ngas, Mupun, and Mwaghavul.

== Bible Translation ==
The New Testament is wholly translated into Miship by Mast Media Methodology, but it is yet to undergo the due process of Bible Translation; the peer checking, community testing, orthography checking and the consultant checking. The Oral Bible Translation is in progress. The Miship Bible Translation Team is in partnership with NBTT for this project.

== Names ==
Miship names are generally unisex. In order to identify the gender of the bearer of a name, the contracted form of the name is used and modified by a masculine prefix, Da- or a feminine prefix Na- to indicate that the name bearer is a male or female, respectively. For example:

- Naanɗi, the man would be Danaan, and the woman Nanaan.
- Ɗenlong, the man would be Daɗen, and the woman Naɗen.
- Shaakagham, the man would be Dashaa and the woman Nashaa.

In the above examples the contracted forms of the names (which are usually the root word of the names) are Naan, Ɗen and Shaa respectively. Therefore, Da- is added to each of them to produce Danaan, Daɗen and Dashaa as the male-specific variants of the names Naanɗi, Ɗenlong and Shaakagham respectively, while Na- is added to each of them to produce Nanaan, Naɗen and Nashaa as the female-specific variants.

== Words ==
English - Miship

- God - Naan
- father - ndaa
- child - laa
- girl - larep
- boy - laa
- wash - vwang
- person - gurum
- rain - fwan
- children - jep
- food - sɨ
- food - mun
- food - gom
- rice - kapaa
- acha - kɨzuk
- soup - tok
- chicken - koo
- dog - as
- goat - ɨɨ
- meat - luu
- king - long
- animal - long
- animal - luu
- wild animal - luu ɗem

Luu can be meat from animals for example, luu koo means chicken (meat). Luu can also refer to animal e.g luu in the following statement stands for animal: "Mmee a luu ɗe mmee a gurum ma" meaning, "Neither of the two (persons in comparison) is an animal (A Miship proverb meaning "People should be treated equally").

== Phrases/Clauses ==
- What is your name - Sɨm gɨ a we e? (masculine) or Sɨm yi a we e? (femiminine)
- Good night - Naan yaghal kɨ mun, Mu foghot ɓit or Naan ep mun
- Bye - Ɗang mu kaat
- Good morning - Teer shaghap a? or Yaghal gwe a?
- Thank you - Plangɓwer
- I am hungry - Neen ni pɨ laá n'nan

== Numbers ==
- 1) One - kɨmee or mmee
- 2) Two - vɨl or nvɨl
- 3) Three - kun
- 4) Four - feer
- 5) Five - paat
- 6) Six - pemee
- 7) Seven - poghovɨl
- 8) Eight - poghokun
- 9) Nine - poghofaar
- 10) Ten - sar
- 11) Eleven - sarpoo-kɨmee or sarkaa-kɨmee
- 20) Twenty - yagurum
- 21) Twenty-one - yagurum kɨ kɨmee
- 30) Thirty - yagurum kɨ sar
- 31) Thirty-one - yagurum kɨ sarpoo-kɨmee or yagurum kɨ sarkaa-kɨmee
- 40) Forty - yakgurum vɨl
- 41) Forty-one - yakgurum vɨl kɨ kɨmee
- 50) Fifty - yakgurum vɨl kɨ sar
- 60) Sixty - yakgurum kun
- 70) Seventy - yakgurum kun kɨ sar
- 71) Seventy-one - yakgurum kun kɨ sarpoo-kɨmee or yakgurum kun kɨ sarkaa-kɨmee
- 80) Eighty - yakgurum feer
- 81) Eighty-one -yakgurum feer kɨ kɨmee
- 90) Ninety - yakgurum feer kɨ sar
- 91) Ninety-one - yakgurum feer kɨ sarpoo-kɨmee or yakgurum feer kɨ sarkaa-kɨmee
- 100) One hundred - yakgurum paat, ɗaa kɨmee or ɗali kɨmee
- 200) Two hundred - ndaam kɨmee, ɗaa vɨl, ɗali vɨl or yakgurum sar
