= Goemai language =

Afro-Asiatic language of Nigeria

Goemai
- Gamai
- Pronunciation: [gə̀mâi]
- Native to: Nigeria
- Region: Great Muri Plains, Plateau State
- Ethnicity: Goemai people
- Native speakers: 380,000 (2020)
- Language family: Afro-Asiatic: Chadic; West Chadic A; Goemai
- Dialects: Duut; East Ankwe; Dorok; K'wo
- Writing system: Latin

Language codes
- ISO 639-3: ank
- Glottolog: goem1240

Goemai (also Ankwe) is an Afro-Asiatic (Chadic, West Chadic A) language spoken in the Great Muri Plains region of Plateau State in central Nigeria, between the Jos Plateau and Benue River. Goemai is also the name of the ethnic group of speakers of the Goemai language. The name 'Ankwe' has been used to refer to the people, especially in older literature and to outsiders. As of 2020, it is estimated that there are around 380,000 Goemai speakers.

Goemai is a predominantly isolating language with the subject–verb–object constituent order.

The language is considered threatened, which means that its adoption is declining, especially among children. Many are learning Hausa as a first language instead, which is used extensively in official and educational settings.

== Name ==
The spelling Goemai originates from the 1930s. Orthographic oe stands for the mid-central vowel ə, a practice that had been adopted by missionaries working among the Goemai in Shendam during the 1930s, such as Father E. Sirlinger.

== Classification ==
Genetically, Goemai has been consistently classified as a member of the Afro-Asiatic language family in the West Chadic A language sub-family. There have been attempts to apply more specific genetic classifications to Goemai beyond its membership in the West Chadic A language family, but these attempts have not reached a consensus. Hellwig posits that Goemai is further included in the Angas-Gerka, Angas-Goemai, and Southern Angas-Goemai subfamilies, whereas Blench instead classifies Goemai as a member of the Bole-Angas and Angas subfamilies. Glottolog categorizes Goemai as a member of the West Chadic A.3, Goemaic, and Goemai-Chakato subfamilies.

Goemai has four main dialects: Duut, East Ankwe, Dorok, and K'wo, all of which are in common use and are mutually intelligible

== Phonology ==
=== Vowels ===
Goemai has eleven vowel phonemes which can be grouped by length; four short vowels and seven long vowels. Orthographically, long vowels are represented by doubling the vowel symbol. Goemai also contains several vowel sounds which are non-phonemic, but occur allophonically, shown enclosed in square brackets in the table. In the table, sounds are represented on the left in IPA, and the right using Goemai orthography. Vowels are never syllable-initial in Goemai. While syllable-final vowels are generally short, there is no contrast between vowel lengths in this position.

Short Vowels
	Front		Central		Back	
High	/i/	i	[ʉ]	u̲	/u/	u
Mid	[e]	e	/ə/	e, (Note: This orthography is used only when the phoneme occurs in syllable-initial or -medial position) oe (Note: This orthography is used only when the phoneme occurs in syllable-final position)	[o], [ɔ]	o
Low			/a/	a		

Long Vowels
	Front		Central		Back	
High	/iː/	ii	/ʉʉ/	uu	/uu/	uu
High-Mid	/eː/	ee			/oo/	oo
Low-Mid					/ɔɔ/	o̲o̲
Low			/aː/	aa		

Vowel length is contrastive, but only in the middle of syllables, as in pairs such as kúr "tortoise" versus kúːr "burn", and ʃʰɔ̀m "hyrax" versus ʃʰɔ́ːm "guineafowl".

There are also several diphthongs in Goemai, which are not believed to be phonemic. Instead, they likely arise as a result of phonological processes, including labialization and height assimilation. The diphthongs attested in Goemai include [ʉ͡a], [ʉ͡ə], [a͡u], [o͡u], [a͡i], [e͡i], and [o͡ːi].

=== Consonants ===
Goemai has the consonants shown in the chart below, with symbols on the left indicating the IPA transcription, and symbols on the right denoting the orthography used by Hellwig. Symbols enclosed in square brackets are non-phonemic. All of the consonants in the table may appear at in syllable-initial positions, but some are restricted from appearing in syllable-final position. Those phonemes that are attested in syllable-final position are annotated in the table below, while unannotated phonemes appear only at the beginning of a syllable. Goemai has a four-way contrast in its plosive inventory and a three-way contrast in its fricative inventory. Of note is Goemai's contrast between aspirated and unaspirated fricative sounds, which is rare among languages in general.

		Labial		Alveolar		Palatal		Velar		Glottal	
Plosive	plain	/p/ (Note: This phoneme is attested in syllable-final position)	p'	/t/	t'			/k/	k'	[ʔ]	'
Plosive	aspirated	/pʰ/	p	/tʰ/	t			/kʰ/	k		
Plosive	voiced	/b/	b	/d/	d			/g/	g		
Plosive	implosive	/ɓ/	b'	/ɗ/	d'						
Fricative	plain	/f/	f'	/s/	s'	/ʃ/	sh'			/h/	h
Fricative	aspirated	/fʰ/	f	/sʰ/	s	/ʃʰ/	sh				
Fricative	voiced	/v/	v	/z/	z	/ʒ/	j				
Nasal		/m/	m	/n/	n			/ŋ/	ngh, ng		
Liquids	Lateral			/l/	l						
Liquids	Trill			/r/	r						
Glides		/w/	w, u			/j/	y, i				

=== Tone ===
Goemai is a tonal language, making use of several distinctive tones. The exact number and pitch of these tones is disputed. It has been suggested that Goemai has three level tones high (é), mid (ē), and low (è) along with two contour tones: falling (ê) and rising (ě). Tone can be the only contrastive feature between words in Goemai, as shown in the following minimal pairs: ɓák "here" (adv.) versus ɓàk "disregard" (v.), and ʃé "foot/leg" (n.) versus ʃè "learn/teach" (v.).

The level mid tone is not a basic tone of Goemai, and only appears as a result of assimilation or other phonological processes, including downdrift and downstep. Although there are words that are posited to have an underlying rising tone, this tone cannot appear on a single syllable. Instead, it is always spread out across multiple syllables. The following example sentence demonstrates the underlying rising tone of the verb /nǎ/ "see" being spread to the following noun, /mà:r/ "farm". The underlying low tone of the noun then passes to the definite determiner clitic =hɔk, which lacks an underlying tone.

dé-gə̀ nà/ máːr=hɔ̀k (...)
PUR see farm(SG)=DEF (...)
"to see the farm (...)"

The rising tone is alternatively realized as a level high tone if it is not possible for it to spread.

=== Syllable structure ===
There are four syllabic forms in Goemai, as illustrated in the words below, with the relevant syllable(s) bolded.

Template	Instantiation	Translation
CV	**s'óe**	'food'
CVC	**tàl**	'ask/greet'
CVVC	**líít**	'lion'
N	**ǹ**.d'ùùn	'inside'

In syllables of the form CVVC, the VV represents a single long vowel sound. Syllables of the form N can occur when prenasalization of a sound manifests as a syllabic nasal. This is most common with the prenasalizing prefix /ⁿ-/, which acts as an adverbializer when affixed to verbs and as a locative when affixed to nouns.

== Morphology ==
Goemai is classified as a mostly isolating language. The large majority of morphemes consist of a single syllable and the large majority of words consist of a single morpheme. Though infrequent, polymorphemic words are attested in Goemai and can be formed via a number of regular processes. Affixation is sometimes used to form words, although many affixes are found only in non-productive plural forms, and cliticization is more common. Goemai also uses reduplication and compounding to form words. Polysyllabic words are also less frequent than monosyllabic words, but are attested. Most commonly, polysyllabic words are of the form CV.CVC, where the first consonant may be subjected to secondary articulation, including prenasalization, labialization, or palatalization.

There are three open word classes in Goemai: nouns, verbs, and adverbs.

Nouns in Goemai generally lack morphological marking for case, number, gender, and noun class. There are several exceptions to this general trend. For example, several words relating to people and body parts are marked for number, as are most loanwords from the Hausa language. Nouns can be differentiated from other parts of speech based on their syntactic role in a sentence, and the types of modifiers they accept.

In Goemai, verbs are a basic form that can never be derived from other parts of speech. There are therefore no verbalizing morphemes. Moreover, it is quite rare for verbs to join with any other morphemes, be they derivational or inflectional. While individual verbs are generally single morphemes, entire verb phrases can be marked for tense, aspect, or modality.

In Goemai, some adverbs are underived base forms, whereas others are derived from verbs via affixation or cliticization with an adverbializer, as in the following example sentence:

Tù bí=hòk ǹ-tù.
kill(SG) thing=DEF ADVZ-kill(SG)
"Kill the thing killing."

Underived adverbs can be further modified by nominal modifiers, but this is not possible for derived adverbs.

=== Affixation ===
Affixes are uncommon in Goemai, and those that exist are predominantly prefixes, which must take the form CV, unless they consist of just a lone nasal. Two of the most common affixes are the affixes gòe-, which is used as a nominalizer, and N- (a single nasal matching the place of the following consonant), which is used as an adverbializer.

While a handful of suffixes and infixes do exist in the language, they are almost always used nonproductively as plural markers. Around 10% of the verbs of Goemai mark number in this way, while most other verbs in the language are completely unmarked.

=== Cliticization ===
Goemai has a large inventory of clitics, which are used for word formation in broader distribution than affixes. Like prefixes, the majority of clitics take the form CV. Goemai has both proclitics and enclitics, although in Goemai, any clitic can also stand alone as a word on its own.

Most of the clitics in Goemai are phrasal, including the very common clitics =hòe "exactly", and kò= "every/each; any".

Modifiers such as là=, the diminutive singular, and =hok, the definite determiner, can attach to noun phrases as clitics. Question particles typically manifest as enclitics at the end of a clause.

=== Reduplication ===
In Goemai, reduplication is typically partial, though full reduplication exists in certain situations. Reduplication confers different meanings depending on the word being modified. Sometimes, quantifiers or adverbs are reduplicated to indicate increased intensity, as in the case of zòk ("generous") being fully reduplicated as zòkzòk ("very very generous"). Numerals can be reduplicated to indicate that the number is divided over a period of time, or distributed across several entities or groups, as in k'ún ("three") being reduplicated as k'ún k'ún ("three each"). Partial reduplication is also a common technique for adverbializing verbs, as in pyá "become white" (v.) versus pòe-pyá "white" (adv.).

In certain situations, such as when modifying words relating to location or distance, reduplicated forms do not differ in meaning from the base form, as in séng ("far") being partially reduplicated to soè-séng ("far"). In such cases, there is a distinction between partial reduplication, which results in the same meaning as the base form, and full reduplication, which intensifies the meaning. Instead of full reduplication of a word, entire phrases can be reduplicated for a similar intensifying effect.

=== Compounding ===
Polysyllabic words are sometimes formed by combining two existing words via compounding, as in the two-syllable word hàːm.ʃíŋ ("gruel"), which is formed from the two single syllable words hàːm ("water"), and ʃíŋ ("mix").

=== Ideophones ===
Certain verbs of Goemai can be modified by a special class of approximately 80 ideophones. Each modifies only a single other verb in the language, and can modify no other verb. The effect of this modification is to emphasize the result of the verb, as in the following example (ideophone in bold):

hèn=jààl gúlús
1SG.S=belch IDEOPH
"I belched loudly"

== Syntax ==
=== Basic Word Order ===
==== Transitive Clauses ====
The basic word order of Goemai is strictly subject-verb-object in transitive clauses, as shown in the following example sentences.

Fuán máng p'áng
rabbit take stone
"The rabbit took a stone"

Muèp d'án nì
3PL.S cook/warm 3SG.O
"They boil it"

Muèp dók yà fuán
3PL.S:CONS PAST.REM catch rabbit
"They caught the rabbit"

==== Intransitive Clauses ====
In intransitive sentences, there is a strict SV basic word order, as shown below:

Hèn=lùùt
1SG.S=be.afraid(SG)
"I was scared."

==== Argument Omission ====
In cases where arguments are redundant, or can be inferred from the surrounding context, they are usually omitted. In particular, the subject may be omitted entirely if it is third person singular, so long as it is clear which entity is being referenced. In addition, direct objects may be omitted, but only if they refer to inanimate objects or lower animals.

In the following example, the subject "rabbit" is omitted after being introduced once:

Fuán mán án. Sái rú kúút t'ó ǹd'ùùn là=báng.
rabbit know mind then/only enter(SG) just lie(SG) INSIDE:GEN DIM(SG):GEN=calabash
"The rabbit knew a trick. Then (he) just entered (and) lay inside a little calabash."

== Bibliography ==
- Hellwig, Birgit (2011) A Grammar of Goemai. 596 p., Mouton De Gruyter. ISBN 3-11-023828-4, ISBN 978-3-11-023828-0.
- Hellwig, Birgit (2003) Fieldwork among the Goemai in Nigeria: discovering the grammar of property expressions. STUF
- Hellwig, Birgit (2003) The grammatical coding of postural semantics in Goemai (a West Chadic language of Nigeria). MPI Series in Psycholinguistics [dissertation Nijmegen]. [the introduction contains info about the geography, demography, and sociolinguistics of Goemai; chapter 2 is a grammatical sketch of Goemai]
- Hoffman, Carl (1970) 'Towards a comoparative phonology of the languages of the Angas–Goemai group.' Unpublished manuscript.
- Kraft, Charles H. (1981) Chadic wordlists. Berlin: Dietrich Reimer (Marburger Studien zur Afrika- und Asienkunde, Serie A: Afrika, 23, 24, 25). [contains a phonological sketch of Goemai and also a Goemai word list]
- Wolff, Hans (1959) 'Subsystem typologies and area linguistics.' Anthropological Linguistics, 1, 7, 1–88. [phonological inventory of Goemai (Duut dialect)]
