= Shendam =

Shendam yil Du'ut Mudu'ut
- LGA and town
- Interactive map of Shendam
- Location in Nigeria
- Coordinates: 8°43′N 9°30′E
- Country: Nigeria
- State: Plateau State

Government
  - Local Government Chairman: Nicholas Nshe
  - Long goemai II (Head of Shendam Traditional Council of Chiefs): Miskoom Martin Mudu'utrie

Area
  - Total: 2,477 km^{2} (956 sq mi)

Population (2006 census)
  - Total: 205,119
  - Density: 82.81/km^{2} (214.5/sq mi)
- Time zone: UTC+1 (WAT)
- 3-digit postal code prefix: 940
- ISO 3166 code: NG.PL.SH

Shendam is a town and Local Government Area in Plateau State, Nigeria. It is bordered by Ibi in Taraba State to the south, Qua'an Pan to the east, Pankshin to the north, and Mikang to the west. Shendam is the second most populous town in Plateau State, after Jos at 8°53′00″N 9°32′00″E.

It has an area of 2,477 km^{2} and a population of 208,017 at the 2006 census.

The postal code of the area is 940.

The Goemai language and many other West Chadic languages are spoken in Shendam LGA.

== Geography ==
Shendam LGA has an average temperature of 26 degrees Celsius or 80 degrees Fahrenheit and a total area of 2,477 square kilometres or 956 square miles. The Npol and Nroam lakes are located in the LGA, which has an average humidity of 50%. Also located in Shendam LGA is the well-known Jelbang Rocks.

=== Climate ===
In Shendam, the year-round heat is accompanied by a partly cloudy dry season and an uncomfortable wet season. The average annual temperature fluctuates between 65 °F and 100 °F; it is seldom lower or higher than 61 °F or 104 °F.

The climate of Shendam is classified as tropical wet and dry, or savanna (Aw). The district experiences a yearly temperature of 26.98 °C (80.56 °F), which is -2.48% colder than the average for Nigeria. Shendam has 172.44 wet days (47.24% of the time) and averages 147.71 millimeters (5.82 inches) of precipitation yearly.

=== Average Temperature ===
There is an average daily high temperature of over 96 °F during the 2.5-month long hot season, which runs from January 29 to April 13. Shendam experiences its highest temperatures of 99 °F and lowest of 76 °F in March, making it the hottest month of the year. With daily highs that average less than 87 °F, the chilly season spans 3.9 months, from June 20 to October 18. With an average low of 72 °F and high of 84 °F, August is the coolest month of the year in Shendam.
