= 2023 Kebbi State gubernatorial election =

2023 gubernatorial election in Kebbi State, Nigeria

- 18 March 2023
- Registered: 2,032,041
Nominee	Nasir Idris	Aminu Bande
Party	APC	PDP
Running mate	Abubakar Umar Argungu	Samaila Salihu Bui
Popular vote	409,225	360,940
Percentage	52.37%	46.19%
Governor before election
Abubakar Atiku Bagudu
APC
Elected Governor
Nasir Idris
APC

The 2023 Kebbi State gubernatorial election was held on 18 March 2023, to elect the Governor of Kebbi State, concurrent with elections to the Kebbi State House of Assembly as well as twenty-seven other gubernatorial elections and elections to all other state houses of assembly. The election — which was postponed from its original 11 March date — was held three weeks after the presidential election and National Assembly elections. Incumbent APC Governor Abubakar Atiku Bagudu was term-limited and could not seek re-election to a third term. Nasir Idris, a teachers' union leader, held the office for the APC by a margin of 6% over the PDP nominee — former Army major general Aminu Bande.

Party primaries were scheduled for between 4 April and 9 June 2022 with the Peoples Democratic Party nominating Bande on 25 May while the All Progressives Congress nominated Idris on 26 May.

On 20 March, INEC declared the election inconclusive as the margin between Idris and Bande was exceeded by the number of collected PVCs in polling units where the election was cancelled. The commission set the date for the supplementary election for 15 April, along with other supplementary elections nationwide. After the supplementary election, INEC declared Idris as the victor on 17 April with results showing him winning about 409,000 votes (~52% of the vote) to defeat Bande's nearly 361,000 votes (46% of the vote). Bande immediately rejected the results, alleging irregularities and decrying the arrest of scores of PDP members before vowing to go to court. In the ensuing legal battles, judgments from the election petitions tribunal in October, Court of Appeals in November, and Supreme Court in January 2024 upheld Idris' victory.

== Electoral system ==
The Governor of Kebbi State is elected using a modified two-round system. To be elected in the first round, a candidate must receive the plurality of the vote and over 25% of the vote in at least two-thirds of state local government areas. If no candidate passes this threshold, a second round will be held between the top candidate and the next candidate to have received a plurality of votes in the highest number of local government areas.

== Background ==
Kebbi State is a diverse, northwestern state with a growing economy but is facing rising insecurity and desertification. Politically, the 2019 elections confirmed the state's status as one of the most staunchly APC states in the nation as both Buhari and Atiku Bagudu won the state by wide margins and every single legislative seat on the senatorial, House of Representatives, and House of Assembly levels were carried by APC nominees.

At the beginning of his term, Atiku Bagudu said his administration would focus on economic diversification, further improving immunization levels, and infrastructure. In terms of his performance, Atiku Bagudu was commended for environmental protection and agricultural development but was criticized for new revelations to his previously-known looting of state funds during the Abacha administration involving his renewed attempts to retake some of the stolen funds that had been seized and his desperate attempts to keep hold of the loot still in his possession.

== Primary elections ==
The primaries, along with any potential challenges to primary results, will take place between 4 April and 3 June 2022. An informal zoning gentlemen's agreement sets the Kebbi South Senatorial District to have the next governor as Kebbi South has never produced a governor. However, another interpretation of zoning based on the traditional emirates in the state would set up the Argungu, Yauri and Zuru emirates to produce the next governor as the largest Gwandu Emirate has held the office for much of the state's history. However, no major party has yet formally zoned their primaries.

=== All Progressives Congress ===
Analysts view the APC gubernatorial primary as a likely battle between the preexisting major factions within the Kebbi State APC with one faction led by outgoing governor Abubakar Atiku Bagudu and the other faction led by Kebbi Central Senator and former governor Adamu Aliero. Aliero was reportedly backing the gubernatorial candidacy of Kebbi North Senator Yahaya Abubakar Abdullahi while conflicting reports stated that Atiku Bagudu was supporting Attorney-General Abubakar Malami or former Finance Commissioner Ibrahim Muhammad Augie; an added element of the party crisis is the supposed ambition of Atiku Bagudu to run against Aliero in the Kebbi Central senatorial primary. Tensions between the factions reached a head in late 2021 when Aliero's faction broke away and elected separate leadership to Atiku Bagudu's faction setting up a dispute over which was the legitimate party organization. As Atiku Bagudu is a serving governor, his faction was recognized by the national party in February 2022 but the internal rift has remained as questions of zoning and godfather support have continued. Further controversy arose when Malami officially announced his candidacy, firstly that Malami refused to resign as attorney-general in accordance with the Electoral Act and secondly when photos emerged of over two hundred luxury cars Malami gave to delegates as bribes. However, when finally directed to resign by Buhari in May 2022, Malami instead dropped out of the gubernatorial race amid reports that he did not believe he could win the primary.

On 20 April 2022, the APC National Executive Committee announced the party's schedule for gubernatorial primaries, setting its expression of interest form price at ₦10 million and nomination form price at ₦40 million with a 50% nomination form discount for candidates younger than 40 while women and candidates with disabilities get free nomination forms. Forms were to be sold from 26 April to 6 May until the deadline was later extended to 10 May then 12 May. After the submission of nomination forms by 13 May, candidates were screened by a party committee on 14 and 15 May while 16 May was the date for the screening appeal process. Ward congresses and LGA congresses were set for between 7 and 9 May to elect delegates for the primary. Candidates approved by the screening process advanced to a primary set for 26 May, in concurrence with other APC gubernatorial primaries; challenges to the result could be made the next day.

After Malami withdrew, union leader Nasir Idris was drafted in by allies of Atiku Bagudu to run as the governor's anointed candidate instead. On the primary date, the three candidates contested an indirect primary that ended with Idris emerging as the party gubernatorial nominee after results showed him winning just under 97% of the delegates' votes. In his acceptance speech, Idris thanked delegates and pledged to lead the state well while Abdullahi, who got zero votes, rejected the results as fabricated before defecting to the PDP a few weeks later.

==== Nominated ====
- Nasir Idris: President of the Nigeria Union of Teachers and Vice National Chairman of the Nigeria Labour Congress
  - Running mate—Abubakar Umar Argungu

==== Eliminated in primary ====
- Yahaya Abubakar Abdullahi: Senator for Kebbi North (2015–present) and former Sokoto State Commissioner for Agriculture and Natural Resources (1990–1991) (defected after the primary to the PDP to run for re-election as senator for Kebbi North)
- Abubakar Gari Malam: former Customs service official

==== Withdrew ====
- Abubakar Malami: Minister of Justice and Attorney General of the Federation (2015–present)
- Saliso Isa Nataro: 2019 NDP gubernatorial nominee

==== Declined ====
- Samaila Yombe Dabai: Deputy Governor (2015–2023)
- Ibrahim Mohammed Mera: 2019 APC gubernatorial candidate
- Ibrahim Muhammad Augie: former Commissioner for Finance
- Bala Ibn Na'allah: Senator for Kebbi South (2015–present) and former House of Representatives member for Fakai/Sakaba/Wasagu/Danko/Zuru (2003–2011)
- Hussaini Suleiman Kangiwa: former House of Representatives member for Arewa/Dandi
- Babale Umar Yauri: Secretary to the State Government

==== Results ====
Candidates' vote share
1. Nasir Idris (96.8%)
2. Abubakar Gari Malam (3.21%)

APC primary results
Party	Candidate	Votes	%
APC	Nasir Idris	1,055	96.79%
APC	Abubakar Gari Malam	35	3.21%
APC	Yahaya Abubakar Abdullahi	0	0.00%
Total votes		1,090	100.00%
Turnout		1,090	Unknown

=== People's Democratic Party ===
On 16 March 2022, the national PDP announced its gubernatorial primaries' schedule, setting its expression of interest form price at ₦1 million and the nomination form price at ₦20 million with a 50% discount for candidates between 25 and 30. Forms were to be sold until 1 April but the party later extended the deadline four times before reaching a final deadline of 22 April. After the submission of nomination forms by 25 April, candidates were screened by a party committee on 28 April while 2 May was the rescheduled date for the screening appeal process. Ward congresses were set for 29 April and LGA congresses were rescheduled for 10 May to elect delegates for the primary. Candidates approved by the screening process advanced to a primary set for 25 May, in concurrence with all other PDP gubernatorial primaries; challenges to the result could be made in the following days.

In the five candidate primary, former Army major general Aminu Bande won by a substantial margin of about 51% of the votes cast. In his acceptance speech at the primary venue in Birnin Kebbi, Bande vowed to carry the party to victory and rehabilitate the state.

==== Nominated ====
- Aminu Bande: former Army major general
  - Running mate—Samaila Salihu Bui: House of Assembly member

==== Eliminated in primary ====
- Ibrahim Abdullahi Manga: PDP Deputy National Publicity Secretary
- Buhari Bala: former Minister of State for Foreign Affairs
- Haruna Garba Argungu: energy manager
- Saidu Samaila Sambawa: former Minister of Sports and Social Development

==== Declined ====
- Sarkin-Yaki Bello: 2015 PDP gubernatorial nominee
- Isa Mohammed Galaudu: 2019 PDP gubernatorial nominee and former Senator for Kebbi North (2011–2015)
- Umaru Tafidan Argungu: 2019 PDP gubernatorial candidate and former Senator for Kebbi North (2007–2011)

==== Results ====
Candidates' vote share
1. Aminu Bande (69.0%)
2. Ibrahim Abdullahi Manga (18.4%)
3. Buhari Bala (6.30%)
4. Other candidates (6.29%)

PDP primary results
Party	Candidate	Votes	%
PDP	Aminu Bande	471	68.96%
PDP	Ibrahim Abdullahi Manga	126	18.45%
PDP	Buhari Bala	43	6.30%
PDP	Haruna Garba Argungu	22	3.22%
PDP	Saidu Samaila Sambawa	21	3.07%
Total votes		683	100.00%
Turnout		683	Unknown

=== Minor parties ===
- Sani Abdullahi Mohammed (Accord)
  - Running mate: Aishatu Salihu
- Ahmadu Zumaru (Action Alliance)
  - Running mate: Bello Dan'Ate Abdullahi Argungu
- Garba Abubakar Zuru (Action Democratic Party)
  - Running mate: Umar Muhammed Dangara
- Saidu Abubakar (Action Peoples Party)
  - Running mate: Abubakar Miskiyu
- Zayanu Abubakar (African Democratic Congress)
  - Running mate: Abubakar Hassan
- Usman Aliyu Kaoje (Allied Peoples Movement)
  - Running mate: Fatima Mohhammed
- Umar Isah (Boot Party)
  - Running mate: Basiru Salai
- Gambo Tase Paul (Labour Party)
  - Running mate: Sani A. Habibu
- Manbo Bashri Susi Altine (National Rescue Movement)
  - Running mate: Isah Mohammed
- Abubakar Hudu-Idris (People's Redemption Party)
  - Running mate: Sani Daudu Tadurga
- Atiku Ahmed Maiahu (Social Democratic Party)
  - Running mate: Abubakar Umar Nafiu
- Sani Lami Muhammed (Young Progressives Party)
  - Running mate: Atiku Sahabi
- Magaji Suleman (Zenith Labour Party)
  - Running mate: Yahaya Hassan

== Campaign ==
In the wake of the primaries, mass defections riddled both major parties as aggrieved APC members led by Adamu Aliero and Yahaya Abubakar Abdullahi decamped to the PDP while the APC also wooed defectors as a campaign tactic. The Aliero vs. Bagudu dispute that dominated Kebbi APC politics in the years prior to the primaries and into the gubernatorial general election campaign was compounded by the fact that Aliero and Bagudu were running against each other for the Kebbi Central senatorial seat. As the elections neared, campaigning intensified in December and January with Idris vowed to improve education and agriculture while Bande promised to combat banditry using his military experience.

By February, attention largely switched to the presidential election on 25 February. In the election, Kebbi State voted for Atiku Abubakar (PDP); Abubakar won 50.1% of the vote to defeat Bola Tinubu (APC) at 44.3%. Although the close result was unsurprising, the close margin and PDP win led to increased attention on the competitiveness of the gubernatorial race. Additionally, Bagudu lost to Aliero in the senatorial race and internal APC strife continued while the PDP grew from its federal election successes and zoning dynamics. The EiE-SBM forecast projected Bande to win while a Vanguard piece labeled the election as a "50-50" race.

== Projections ==
Source	Projection	As of
Africa Elects (Note: AfricaElects projections predict the likelihood of a candidate winning a state by categorizing a state as "Safe" for exceedingly likely, "Likely" for somewhat likely, and "Lean" for least likely. If no clear determination could be made, states are categorized as "tossups".)	Lean Bande	17 March 2023
Enough is Enough- SBM Intelligence (Note: EiE-SBM projections predict which candidates will win states.)	Bande	2 March 2023

== Conduct ==
=== Electoral timetable ===
On 26 February 2022, the Independent National Electoral Commission released the timetable, setting out key dates and deadlines for the election. Months later on 27 May 2022, INEC made a slight revision to the timetable, allowing parties extra time to conduct primaries.

- 28 February 2022 – Publication of Notice of Election
- 4 April 2022 – First day for the conduct of party primaries
- 9 June 2022 (Note: The original deadline was 3 June; however, INEC pushed it back to 9 June at the behest of parties.) – Final day for the conduct of party primaries, including the resolution of disputes arising from them
- 1 July 2022 – First day for submission of nomination forms to INEC via the online portal
- 15 July 2022 – Final day for submission of nomination forms to INEC via the online portal
- 12 October 2022 – Commencement of the official campaign period
- 16 March 2023 (Note: The original deadline was 9 March; however, INEC pushed it back to 16 March.) – Final day of the official campaign period

== General election ==
2023 Kebbi State gubernatorial election
Party	Candidate	Votes	%
A			
AA			
ADP			
APP			
AAC			
ADC			
APM			
APC			
APGA			
BP			
LP			
New Nigeria Peoples Party			
NRM			
PDP			
PRP			
SDP			
YPP			
ZLP			
Total votes			100.00%
Turnout			

=== By senatorial district ===
The results of the election by senatorial district.

Senatorial District	Nasir Idris APC		Aminu Bande PDP		Others		Total Valid Votes
Senatorial District	Votes	Percentage	Votes	Percentage	Votes	Percentage	Total Valid Votes
Kebbi Central Senatorial District (Note: Comprising the local government areas of Aliero, Birnin Kebbi, Bunza, Gwandu, Kalgo, Koko/Besse, and Maiyama.)	TBD	%	TBD	%	TBD	%	TBD
Kebbi North Senatorial District (Note: Comprising the local government areas of Arewa Dandi, Argungu, Augie, Bagudo, Dandi, Jega, and Suru.)	TBD	%	TBD	%	TBD	%	TBD
Kebbi South Senatorial District (Note: Comprising the local government areas of Fakai, Ngaski, Sakaba, Shanga, Wasagu/Danko, Yauri, and Zuru.)	TBD	%	TBD	%	TBD	%	TBD
Totals	TBD	%	TBD	%	TBD	%	TBD

=== By federal constituency ===
The results of the election by federal constituency.

Federal Constituency	Nasir Idris APC		Aminu Bande PDP		Others		Total Valid Votes
Federal Constituency	Votes	Percentage	Votes	Percentage	Votes	Percentage	Total Valid Votes
Aleiro/Gwandu/Jega Federal Constituency (Note: Comprising the local government areas of Aleiro, Gwandu, and Jega.)	TBD	%	TBD	%	TBD	%	TBD
Arewa/Dandi Federal Constituency (Note: Comprising the local government area of Arewa Dandi.)	TBD	%	TBD	%	TBD	%	TBD
Argungu/Augie Federal Constituency (Note: Comprising the local government areas of Argungu and Augie.)	TBD	%	TBD	%	TBD	%	TBD
Bagudo/Suru Federal Constituency (Note: Comprising the local government areas of Bagudo and Suru.)	TBD	%	TBD	%	TBD	%	TBD
Bunza/Birnin Kebbi/Kalgo Federal Constituency (Note: Comprising the local government areas of Birnin Kebbi, Bunza, and Kalgo.)	TBD	%	TBD	%	TBD	%	TBD
Fakai/Sakaba/Wasagu/Danko/Zuru Federal Constituency (Note: Comprising the local government areas of Fakai, Sakaba, Wasagu/Danko, and Zuru.)	TBD	%	TBD	%	TBD	%	TBD
Koko-Besse/Maiyama Federal Constituency (Note: Comprising the local government areas of Koko/Besse and Maiyama.)	TBD	%	TBD	%	TBD	%	TBD
Ngaski/Shanga/Yauri Federal Constituency (Note: Comprising the local government areas of Ngaski, Shanga, and Yauri.)	TBD	%	TBD	%	TBD	%	TBD
Totals	TBD	%	TBD	%	TBD	%	TBD

=== By local government area ===
The results of the election by local government area.

LGA	Nasir Idris APC		Aminu Bande PDP		Others		Total Valid Votes	Turnout Percentage
LGA	Votes	Percentage	Votes	Percentage	Votes	Percentage	Total Valid Votes	Turnout Percentage
Aleiro	TBD	%	TBD	%	TBD	%	TBD	%
Arewa Dandi	TBD	%	TBD	%	TBD	%	TBD	%
Argungu	TBD	%	TBD	%	TBD	%	TBD	%
Augie	TBD	%	TBD	%	TBD	%	TBD	%
Bagudo	TBD	%	TBD	%	TBD	%	TBD	%
Birnin Kebbi	TBD	%	TBD	%	TBD	%	TBD	%
Bunza	TBD	%	TBD	%	TBD	%	TBD	%
Dandi	TBD	%	TBD	%	TBD	%	TBD	%
Fakai	TBD	%	TBD	%	TBD	%	TBD	%
Gwandu	TBD	%	TBD	%	TBD	%	TBD	%
Jega	TBD	%	TBD	%	TBD	%	TBD	%
Kalgo	TBD	%	TBD	%	TBD	%	TBD	%
Koko/Besse	TBD	%	TBD	%	TBD	%	TBD	%
Maiyama	TBD	%	TBD	%	TBD	%	TBD	%
Ngaski	TBD	%	TBD	%	TBD	%	TBD	%
Sakaba	TBD	%	TBD	%	TBD	%	TBD	%
Shanga	TBD	%	TBD	%	TBD	%	TBD	%
Suru	TBD	%	TBD	%	TBD	%	TBD	%
Wasagu/Danko	TBD	%	TBD	%	TBD	%	TBD	%
Yauri	TBD	%	TBD	%	TBD	%	TBD	%
Zuru	TBD	%	TBD	%	TBD	%	TBD	%
Totals	TBD	%	TBD	%	TBD	%	TBD	%

== See also ==
- 2023 Nigerian elections
- 2023 Nigerian gubernatorial elections
