= 2023 Nigerian Senate elections in Kebbi State =

2023 Senate elections in Kebbi

- 25 February 2023

All 3 Kebbi State seats in the Senate of Nigeria
	Majority party	Minority party
Party	PDP	APC
Last election	0	3
Seats before	2	1
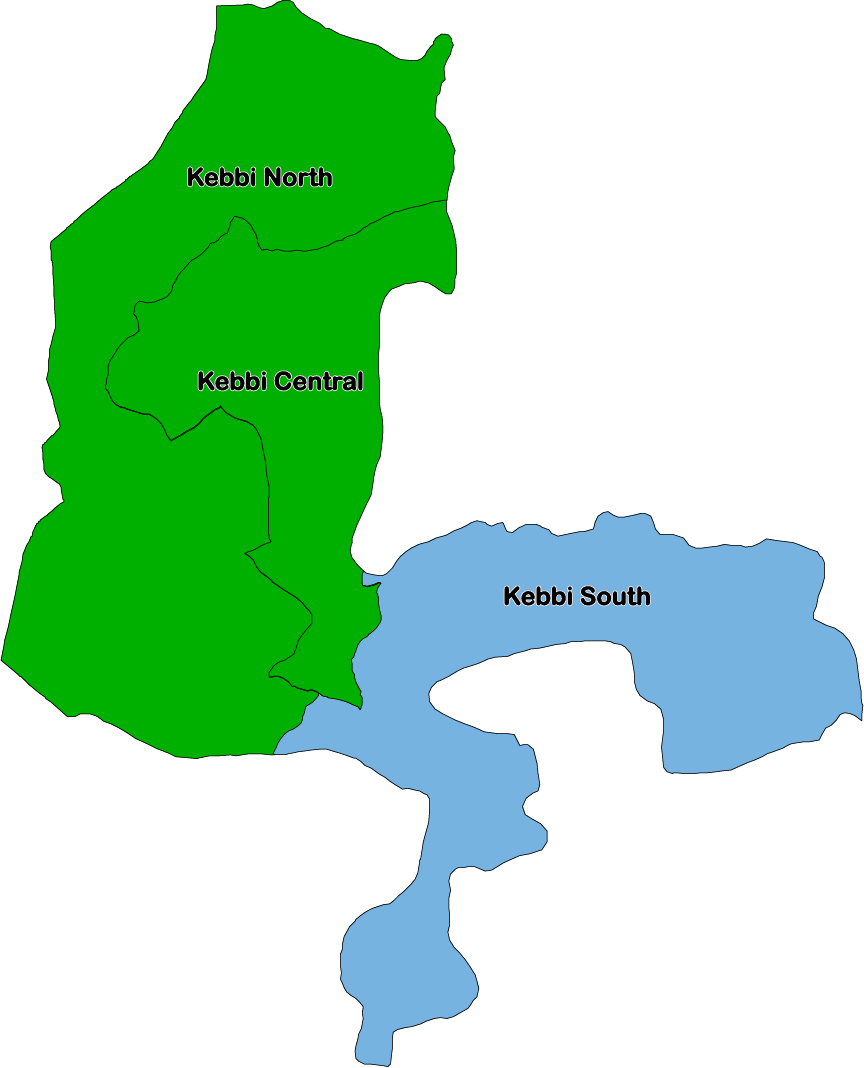
- APC incumbent running for re-election PDP incumbent status unknown

The 2023 Nigerian Senate elections in Kebbi State will be held on 25 February 2023, to elect the 3 federal Senators from Kebbi State, one from each of the state's three senatorial districts. The elections will coincide with the 2023 presidential election, as well as other elections to the Senate and elections to the House of Representatives; with state elections being held two weeks later. Primaries were held between 4 April and 9 June 2022.

== Background ==
In the previous Senate elections, all three incumbent senators were re-elected: Adamu Aliero (APC) held his seat with 73% of the vote in the Central district, Yahaya Abubakar Abdullahi (APC) won with 71% in the North district, and Bala Ibn Na'allah (APC) was returned with 67% in the South district. These results were a part of a slight swing to the Kebbi APC as most House of Representatives seats were won by the party, it won a majority in the House of Assembly, and Buhari won the state in the presidential election.

== Overview ==
Affiliation	Party		Total
Affiliation	APC	PDP	Total
Previous Election	3	0	3
Before Election	1	2	3
After Election	TBD	TBD	3

== Summary ==
District	Incumbent		Results	
District	Incumbent	Party	Status	Candidates
Kebbi Central	Adamu Aliero	PDP (Note: This senator was elected as a member of the APC but switched to the PDP during their term.)	Incumbent withdrew from primary (Note: Senator defected to new party after withdrawing from or losing their former party's primary.); Incumbent re-elected under nomination of new party	▌Abubakar Atiku Bagudu (APC); ▌ ✓ Adamu Aliero (PDP)
Kebbi North	Yahaya Abubakar Abdullahi	PDP (Note: This senator was elected as a member of the APC but switched to the PDP during their term.)	Incumbent's status unknown	▌Hussaini Suleiman Kangiwa (APC); ▌TBD (Note: Ibrahim Bawa Kamba or Yahaya Abubakar Abdullahi) (PDP)
Kebbi South	Bala Ibn Na'allah	APC	Incumbent lost re-election New member elected PDP gain	▌Bala Ibn Na'allah (APC); ▌ ✓ Garba Musa Maidoki (PDP)

== Kebbi Central ==
2023 Kebbi Central Senatorial District election
- 25 February 2023
Nominee	Abubakar Atiku Bagudu	Adamu Aliero
Party	APC	PDP
Senator before election
Adamu Aliero
PDP
Elected Senator
TBD

The Kebbi Central Senatorial District covers the local government areas of Aliero, Birnin Kebbi, Bunza, Gwandu, Kalgo, Koko/Besse, and Maiyama. The incumbent Adamu Aliero (PDP) was re-elected with 73.4% of the vote in 2019 as a member of the APC; he initially sought renomination in the APC before withdrawing from the primary and defecting to win the PDP nomination in June 2022.

=== Primary elections ===
==== All Progressives Congress ====
On 20 April 2022, the APC National Executive Committee announced the party's schedule for senatorial primaries, setting its expression of interest form price at ₦3 million and nomination form price at ₦17 million with a 50% discount for candidates younger than 40 while women and candidates with disabilities get free nomination forms. Forms were to be sold from 26 April to 6 May until the deadline was later extended to 10 May then 12 May. After the submission of nomination forms by 13 May, candidates were screened by a party committee on 14 and 15 May while 18 May was the date for the screening appeal process. Ward congresses and LGA congresses were set for 16 and 17 May to elect delegates for the primary. Candidates approved by the screening process advanced to a primary set for 27 May, in concurrence with other APC senatorial primaries; challenges to the result could be made on 28 May.

Observers view the APC senatorial primary as a continuation of the battle between the preexisting major factions of the Kebbi State APC with one faction led by Aliero and the other faction led by outgoing Governor (and senatorial candidate) Abubakar Atiku Bagudu. In the gubernatorial primary, Aliero backed the candidacy of Kebbi North Senator Yahaya Abubakar Abdullahi while Bagudu eventually supported union leader Nasir Idris. As Bagudu was a serving governor, his faction was recognized by the national party in February 2022 but the internal rift continued as Bagudu and Aliero jostled for the senatorial ticket. A few hours before the primary, Aliero withdrew in a letter alleging that the delegate list had been handpicked by Bagudu to rig the primary in his favour. In the primary, Bagudu was nominated unanimously; he thanked delegates in his acceptance speech. Aliero left the APC a few days later.

==== People's Democratic Party ====
On 16 March 2022, the national PDP announced its senatorial primary timetable, setting its expression of interest form price at ₦1 million and the nomination form price at ₦20 million with a 50% discount for candidates between 25 and 30. Forms were to be sold until 1 April but the party later extended the deadline four times before reaching a final deadline of 22 April. After the submission of nomination forms by 25 April, candidates were screened by a party committee on 27 April while 2 May was the rescheduled date for the screening appeal process. Ward congresses were set for 29 April and LGA congresses were rescheduled for 10 May to elect delegates for the primary. Candidates approved by the screening process advanced to a primary set for 23 May, in concurrence with other PDP senatorial primaries but due to often violently enforced Monday stay-at-home orders by separatists, southeastern state parties held their primaries on 24 May; challenges to the result could be made on 25 May.

On the original primary date, an indirect primary in Birnin Kebbi resulted in Haruna Saidu—former Kebbi State PDP Chairman—being nominated unopposed. However, in the wake of Aliero's defection, the state party annulled the original primary and held a new exercise on 9 June where Aliero defeated Saidu by a wide margin. Saidu protested and sued against the new primary, claiming that he never withdrew as nominee and thus the second primary was invalid. In response, the state PDP expelled Saidu for taking the party to court over the issue and alleged forgery. However, a High Court ruled in favor of Saidu based on the fact that he had not withdrawn from the nomination thus making the rerun primary illegitimate. In early November, Aliero appealed the ruling at an Appeal Court sitting in Sokoto; the court ruled against Aliero later that month. However, Aliero's appeal to the Supreme Court was successful with its 30 January ruling reinstating him as the legitimate nominee.

Invalid rerun primary results

PDP rerun primary results
Party	Candidate	Votes	%
PDP	Adamu Aliero	246	94.25%
PDP	Haruna Saidu	15	5.75%
Total votes		261	100.00%
Invalid or blank votes		3	N/A
Turnout		264	96.00%

=== Campaign ===
Media described the Bagudu vs. Aliero race as a potentially definitive decider on the preeminent political godfather of Kebbi State. However, the court ruling that declared Saidu as the PDP nominee changed the dynamics of the race. By December, after Aliero lost his appeal, pundits began to question if his political career was over. However, Aliero's appeal to the Supreme Court was successful with its 30 January ruling reinstating him as the legitimate nominee.

=== General election ===
==== Results ====
2023 Kebbi Central Senatorial District election
Party	Candidate	Votes	%
AA	Faruk Umar		
ADC	Junaidu Muhammad		
APC	Abubakar Atiku Bagudu		
APGA	Junaidu Muhammad		
APM	Muhammed Bello Haruna		
NRM	Faruk Garba		
New Nigeria Peoples Party	Zayyanu Magaji		
PRP	Ahmed Umar Rufai		
PDP	Adamu Aliero		
SDP	Abubakar Bello Tilli		
ZLP	Zayyanu Muhammed		
Total votes			100.00%
Invalid or blank votes			N/A
Turnout			

== Kebbi North ==
2023 Kebbi North Senatorial District election
- 25 February 2023
Nominee	Hussaini Suleiman Kangiwa	TBD
Party	APC	PDP
Senator before election
Yahaya Abubakar Abdullahi
PDP
Elected Senator
TBD

The Kebbi North Senatorial District covers the local government areas of Arewa Dandi, Argungu, Augie, Bagudo, Dandi, Jega, and Suru. The incumbent Yahaya Abubakar Abdullahi (PDP) was re-elected with 70.9% of the vote in 2019 as a member of the APC. In May 2022, Abdullahi announced that he would run for governor of Kebbi State, instead of seeking re-election. However, Abdullahi lost the APC gubernatorial primary in late May. The next month, he defected to the PDP and was nominated in his new party's senatorial primary.

=== Primary elections ===
==== All Progressives Congress ====
On 20 April 2022, the APC National Executive Committee announced the party's schedule for senatorial primaries, setting its expression of interest form price at ₦3 million and nomination form price at ₦17 million with a 50% discount for candidates younger than 40 while women and candidates with disabilities get free nomination forms. Forms were to be sold from 26 April to 6 May until the deadline was later extended to 10 May then 12 May. After the submission of nomination forms by 13 May, candidates were screened by a party committee on 14 and 15 May while 18 May was the date for the screening appeal process. Ward congresses and LGA congresses were set for 16 and 17 May to elect delegates for the primary. Candidates approved by the screening process advanced to a primary set for 27 May, in concurrence with other APC senatorial primaries; challenges to the result could be made on 28 May.

In the primary resulted in the nomination of former MHR Hussaini Suleiman Kangiwa. Suleiman Kangiwa was unopposed as his sole opponent—former Governor Usman Saidu Nasamu Dakingari—withdrew just before the primary.

==== People's Democratic Party ====
On 16 March 2022, the national PDP announced its senatorial primary timetable, setting its expression of interest form price at ₦1 million and the nomination form price at ₦20 million with a 50% discount for candidates between 25 and 30. Forms were to be sold until 1 April but the party later extended the deadline four times before reaching a final deadline of 22 April. After the submission of nomination forms by 25 April, candidates were screened by a party committee on 27 April while 2 May was the rescheduled date for the screening appeal process. Ward congresses were set for 29 April and LGA congresses were rescheduled for 10 May to elect delegates for the primary. Candidates approved by the screening process advanced to a primary set for 23 May, in concurrence with other PDP senatorial primaries but due to often violently enforced Monday stay-at-home orders by separatists, southeastern state parties held their primaries on 24 May; challenges to the result could be made on 25 May.

On the original primary date, an indirect primary resulted in former MHR Ibrahim Bawa Kamba being nominated over fellow former MHR Sani Bawa Arugungu by a wide margin. However, the PDP later nominated incumbent Abdullahi after he joined the party.

=== Campaign ===
While noting the ongoing litigation between Bawa Kamba and Abdullahi over the PDP nomination, reporting from The Nation in December gave the edge to Suleiman Kangiwa due to the APC's structural advantages in the district.

=== General election ===
==== Results ====
2023 Kebbi North Senatorial District election
Party	Candidate	Votes	%
APP	Abdullahi Buhari		
ADC	Ahmad Shehu		
APC	Hussaini Suleiman Kangiwa		
APM	Isah Lawal Yeldu		
New Nigeria Peoples Party	Sadiq Muhammad Abubakar		
PRP	Garba Muhammad Kangiwa		
PDP	TBD		
SDP	Adamu Abdullahi		
ZLP	Umar Ladan Aliyu		
Total votes			100.00%
Invalid or blank votes			N/A
Turnout			

== Kebbi South ==
2023 Kebbi South Senatorial District election
- 25 February 2023
Nominee	Bala Ibn Na'allah	Garba Musa Maidoki
Party	APC	PDP
Senator before election
Bala Ibn Na'allah
APC
Elected Senator
TBD

The Kebbi South Senatorial District covers the local government areas of Fakai, Ngaski, Sakaba, Shanga, Wasagu/Danko, Yauri, and Zuru. Incumbent Bala Ibn Na'allah (APC) was re-elected with 67.3% of the vote in 2019 and is seeking re-election.

=== Primary elections ===
==== All Progressives Congress ====
On 20 April 2022, the APC National Executive Committee announced the party's schedule for senatorial primaries, setting its expression of interest form price at ₦3 million and nomination form price at ₦17 million with a 50% discount for candidates younger than 40 while women and candidates with disabilities get free nomination forms. Forms were to be sold from 26 April to 6 May until the deadline was later extended to 10 May then 12 May. After the submission of nomination forms by 13 May, candidates were screened by a party committee on 14 and 15 May while 18 May was the date for the screening appeal process. Ward congresses and LGA congresses were set for 16 and 17 May to elect delegates for the primary. Candidates approved by the screening process advanced to a primary set for 27 May, in concurrence with other APC senatorial primaries; challenges to the result could be made on 28 May.

The primary, held at the Zuru Town Hall in Zuru, resulted in the renomination of Na'allah as he defeated two challengers—Shehu Muazu and Sule-Iko Sami. After the primary, Na'allah thanked the delegates and pledged to win the general election.

APC primary results
Party	Candidate	Votes	%
APC	Bala Ibn Na'allah	287	82.71%
APC	Shehu Muazu	47	13.54%
APC	Sule-Iko Sami	13	3.75%
Total votes		347	100.00%
Invalid or blank votes		0	N/A
Turnout		347	100.00%

==== People's Democratic Party ====
On 16 March 2022, the national PDP announced its senatorial primary timetable, setting its expression of interest form price at ₦1 million and the nomination form price at ₦20 million with a 50% discount for candidates between 25 and 30. Forms were to be sold until 1 April but the party later extended the deadline four times before reaching a final deadline of 22 April. After the submission of nomination forms by 25 April, candidates were screened by a party committee on 27 April while 2 May was the rescheduled date for the screening appeal process. Ward congresses were set for 29 April and LGA congresses were rescheduled for 10 May to elect delegates for the primary. Candidates approved by the screening process advanced to a primary set for 23 May, in concurrence with other PDP senatorial primaries but due to often violently enforced Monday stay-at-home orders by separatists, southeastern state parties held their primaries on 24 May; challenges to the result could be made on 25 May.

The primary resulted in the nomination of Garba Musa Maidoki unopposed.

=== General election ===
==== Results ====
2023 Kebbi South Senatorial District election
Party	Candidate	Votes	%
APP	Hassan Abdullahi		
ADC	Halilu Magaji		
APC	Bala Ibn Na'allah		
APM	Hussaini Musa		
NRM	Abdullahi Samaila		
New Nigeria Peoples Party	Isah Riba Haruna		
PRP	Abubakar Sanusi		
PDP	Garba Musa Maidoki		
SDP	Danladi B. Marafa		
Total votes			100.00%
Invalid or blank votes			N/A
Turnout			

== See also ==
- 2023 Nigerian Senate election
- 2023 Nigerian elections
