= 2023 Nigerian presidential election in Kebbi State =

- 25 February 2023
- Registered: 2,032,041
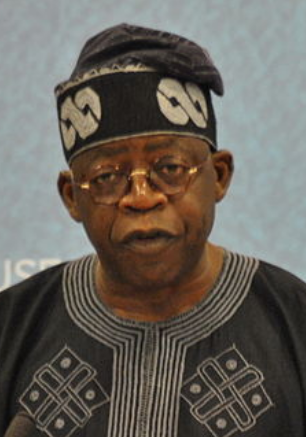

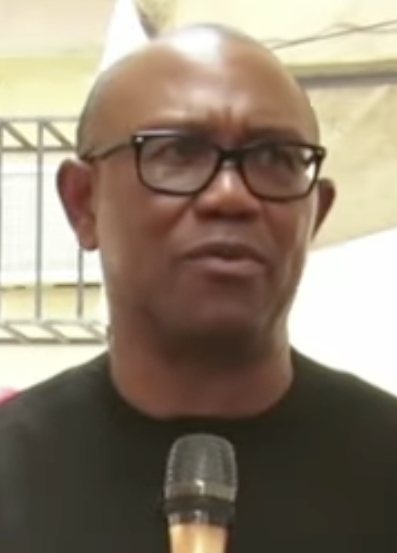

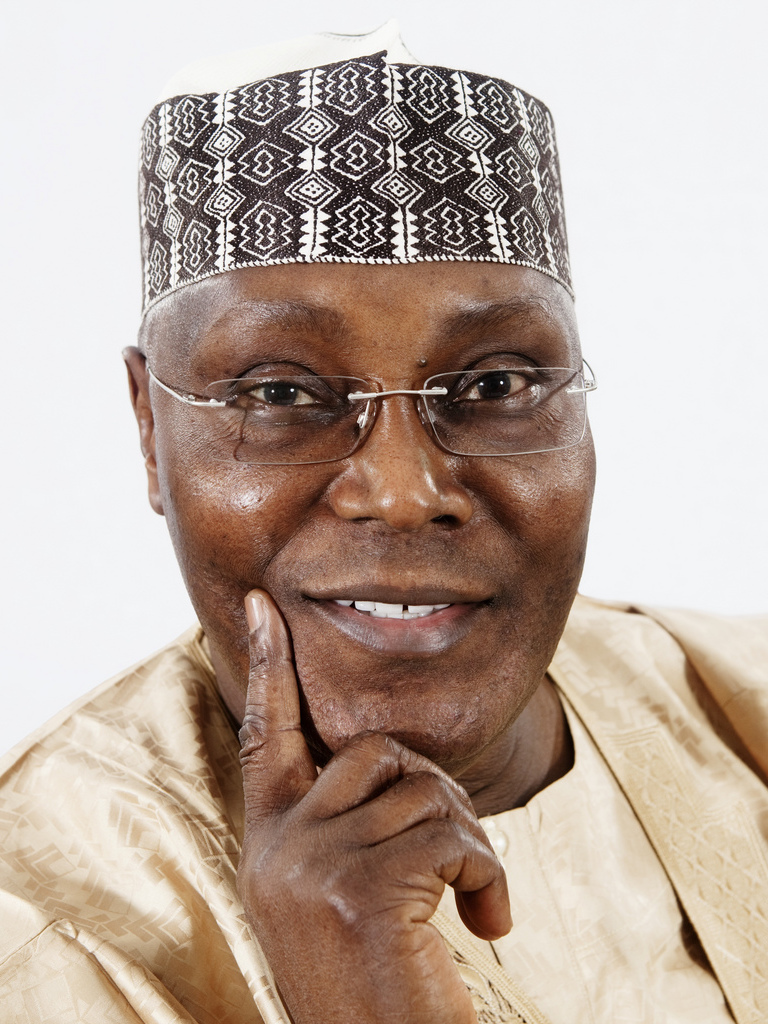
Nominee	Bola Tinubu	Peter Obi
Party	APC	LP
Home state	Lagos	Anambra
Running mate	Kashim Shettima	Yusuf Datti Baba-Ahmed
Nominee	Rabiu Kwankwaso	Atiku Abubakar
Party	New Nigeria Peoples Party	PDP
Home state	Kano	Adamawa
Running mate	Isaac Idahosa	Ifeanyi Okowa
President before election
Muhammadu Buhari
APC
Elected President
TBD

The 2023 Nigerian presidential election in Kebbi State will be held on 25 February 2023 as part of the nationwide 2023 Nigerian presidential election to elect the president and vice president of Nigeria. Other federal elections, including elections to the House of Representatives and the Senate, will also be held on the same date while state elections will be held two weeks afterward on 11 March.

== Background ==
Kebbi State is a diverse, northwestern state with a growing economy but is facing rising insecurity and desertification. Politically, the 2019 elections confirmed the state's status as one of the most staunchly APC states in the nation as both Buhari and incumbent Governor Abubakar Atiku Bagudu won the state by wide margins and every single legislative seat on the senatorial, House of Representatives, and House of Assembly levels were carried by APC nominees.

== Polling ==
Polling organisation/client	Fieldwork date	Sample size					Others	Undecided	Undisclosed	Not voting
Polling organisation/client	Fieldwork date	Sample size	Tinubu APC	Obi LP	Kwankwaso NNPP	Abubakar PDP	Others	Undecided	Undisclosed	Not voting
BantuPage	January 2023	N/A	27%	1%	3%	41%	–	21%	3%	3%
Nextier (Kebbi crosstabs of national poll)	27 January 2023	N/A	34.8%	10.1%	–	49.3%	1.4%	4.3%	–	–
SBM Intelligence for EiE (Kebbi crosstabs of national poll)	22 January-6 February 2023	N/A	28%	30%	2%	35%	–	5%	–	–

== Projections ==
Source	Projection		As of
Africa Elects (Note: Africa Elects projections predict the likelihood of a candidate winning a state by categorizing a state as "Safe" for exceedingly likely, "Likely" for somewhat likely, and "Lean" for least likely. If no clear determination could be made, states are categorized as "tossups".)	Lean Abubakar		24 February 2023
Dataphyte (Note: Dataphyte projections predict candidates' projected votal shares in each state.)
Dataphyte	Tinubu:	42.87%	11 February 2023
Dataphyte	Obi:	7.91%	11 February 2023
Dataphyte	Abubakar:	42.87%	11 February 2023
Dataphyte	Others:	6.36%	11 February 2023
Enough is Enough- SBM Intelligence (Note: EiE-SBM projections predict which candidates will win states.)	Abubakar		17 February 2023
SBM Intelligence (Note: SBM projections predict which candidates will win states or, if no determination could be made, categorizes states as "Too close to call" (TCC).)	Too close to call		15 December 2022
ThisDay (Note: ThisDay projections predict candidates' projected votal shares in each state.)
ThisDay	Tinubu:	35%	27 December 2022
ThisDay	Obi:	–	27 December 2022
ThisDay	Kwankwaso:	20%	27 December 2022
ThisDay	Abubakar:	35%	27 December 2022
ThisDay	Others/Undecided:	10%	27 December 2022
The Nation (Note: The Nation projections predict which candidates will win states or, if no determination could be made, categorizes states as "Battlegrounds.")	Tinubu		12-19 February 2023

== General election ==
=== Results ===
2023 Nigerian presidential election in Kebbi State
Party	Candidate	Votes	%
A	Christopher Imumolen		
AA	Hamza al-Mustapha		
ADP	Yabagi Sani		
APP	Osita Nnadi		
AAC	Omoyele Sowore		
ADC	Dumebi Kachikwu		
APC	Bola Tinubu		
APGA	Peter Umeadi		
APM	Princess Chichi Ojei		
BP	Sunday Adenuga		
LP	Peter Obi		
NRM	Felix Johnson Osakwe		
New Nigeria Peoples Party	Rabiu Kwankwaso		
PRP	Kola Abiola		
PDP	Atiku Abubakar		
SDP	Adewole Adebayo		
YPP	Malik Ado-Ibrahim		
ZLP	Dan Nwanyanwu		
Total votes			100.00%
Invalid or blank votes			N/A
Turnout			

==== By senatorial district ====
The results of the election by senatorial district.

Senatorial District	Bola Tinubu APC		Atiku Abubakar PDP		Peter Obi LP		Rabiu Kwankwaso NNPP		Others		Total valid votes
Senatorial District	Votes	%	Votes	%	Votes	%	Votes	%	Votes	%	Total valid votes
Kebbi Central Senatorial District (Note: Comprising the local government areas of Aliero, Birnin Kebbi, Bunza, Gwandu, Kalgo, Koko/Besse, and Maiyama.)	TBD	%	TBD	%	TBD	%	TBD	%	TBD	%	TBD
Kebbi North Senatorial District (Note: Comprising the local government areas of Arewa Dandi, Argungu, Augie, Bagudo, Dandi, Jega, and Suru.)	TBD	%	TBD	%	TBD	%	TBD	%	TBD	%	TBD
Kebbi South Senatorial District (Note: Comprising the local government areas of Fakai, Ngaski, Sakaba, Shanga, Wasagu/Danko, Yauri, and Zuru.)	TBD	%	TBD	%	TBD	%	TBD	%	TBD	%	TBD
Totals	TBD	%	TBD	%	TBD	%	TBD	%	TBD	%	TBD

==== By federal constituency ====
The results of the election by federal constituency.

Federal Constituency	Bola Tinubu APC		Atiku Abubakar PDP		Peter Obi LP		Rabiu Kwankwaso NNPP		Others		Total valid votes
Federal Constituency	Votes	%	Votes	%	Votes	%	Votes	%	Votes	%	Total valid votes
Aleiro/Gwandu/Jega Federal Constituency (Note: Comprising the local government areas of Aleiro, Gwandu, and Jega.)	TBD	%	TBD	%	TBD	%	TBD	%	TBD	%	TBD
Arewa/Dandi Federal Constituency (Note: Comprising the local government area of Arewa Dandi.)	TBD	%	TBD	%	TBD	%	TBD	%	TBD	%	TBD
Argungu/Augie Federal Constituency (Note: Comprising the local government areas of Argungu and Augie.)	TBD	%	TBD	%	TBD	%	TBD	%	TBD	%	TBD
Bagudo/Suru Federal Constituency (Note: Comprising the local government areas of Bagudo and Suru.)	TBD	%	TBD	%	TBD	%	TBD	%	TBD	%	TBD
Bunza/Birnin Kebbi/Kalgo Federal Constituency (Note: Comprising the local government areas of Birnin Kebbi, Bunza, and Kalgo.)	TBD	%	TBD	%	TBD	%	TBD	%	TBD	%	TBD
Fakai/Sakaba/Wasagu/Danko/Zuru Federal Constituency (Note: Comprising the local government areas of Fakai, Sakaba, Wasagu/Danko, and Zuru.)	TBD	%	TBD	%	TBD	%	TBD	%	TBD	%	TBD
Koko-Besse/Maiyama Federal Constituency (Note: Comprising the local government areas of Koko/Besse and Maiyama.)	TBD	%	TBD	%	TBD	%	TBD	%	TBD	%	TBD
Ngaski/Shanga/Yauri Federal Constituency (Note: Comprising the local government areas of Ngaski, Shanga, and Yauri.)	TBD	%	TBD	%	TBD	%	TBD	%	TBD	%	TBD
Totals	TBD	%	TBD	%	TBD	%	TBD	%	TBD	%	TBD

==== By local government area ====
The results of the election by local government area.

Local government area	Bola Tinubu APC		Atiku Abubakar PDP		Peter Obi LP		Rabiu Kwankwaso NNPP		Others		Total valid votes	Turnout (%)
Local government area	Votes	%	Votes	%	Votes	%	Votes	%	Votes	%	Total valid votes	Turnout (%)
Aleiro	TBD	%	TBD	%	TBD	%	TBD	%	TBD	%	TBD	%
Arewa Dandi	TBD	%	TBD	%	TBD	%	TBD	%	TBD	%	TBD	%
Argungu	TBD	%	TBD	%	TBD	%	TBD	%	TBD	%	TBD	%
Augie	TBD	%	TBD	%	TBD	%	TBD	%	TBD	%	TBD	%
Bagudo	TBD	%	TBD	%	TBD	%	TBD	%	TBD	%	TBD	%
Birnin Kebbi	TBD	%	TBD	%	TBD	%	TBD	%	TBD	%	TBD	%
Bunza	TBD	%	TBD	%	TBD	%	TBD	%	TBD	%	TBD	%
Dandi	TBD	%	TBD	%	TBD	%	TBD	%	TBD	%	TBD	%
Fakai	TBD	%	TBD	%	TBD	%	TBD	%	TBD	%	TBD	%
Gwandu	TBD	%	TBD	%	TBD	%	TBD	%	TBD	%	TBD	%
Jega	TBD	%	TBD	%	TBD	%	TBD	%	TBD	%	TBD	%
Kalgo	TBD	%	TBD	%	TBD	%	TBD	%	TBD	%	TBD	%
Koko/Besse	TBD	%	TBD	%	TBD	%	TBD	%	TBD	%	TBD	%
Maiyama	TBD	%	TBD	%	TBD	%	TBD	%	TBD	%	TBD	%
Ngaski	TBD	%	TBD	%	TBD	%	TBD	%	TBD	%	TBD	%
Sakaba	TBD	%	TBD	%	TBD	%	TBD	%	TBD	%	TBD	%
Shanga	TBD	%	TBD	%	TBD	%	TBD	%	TBD	%	TBD	%
Suru	TBD	%	TBD	%	TBD	%	TBD	%	TBD	%	TBD	%
Wasagu/Danko	TBD	%	TBD	%	TBD	%	TBD	%	TBD	%	TBD	%
Yauri	TBD	%	TBD	%	TBD	%	TBD	%	TBD	%	TBD	%
Zuru	TBD	%	TBD	%	TBD	%	TBD	%	TBD	%	TBD	%
Totals	TBD	%	TBD	%	TBD	%	TBD	%	TBD	%	TBD	%

== See also ==
- 2023 Kebbi State elections
- 2023 Nigerian presidential election
