= 2019 Kebbi State gubernatorial election =

2019 gubernatorial election in Kebbi State, Nigeria

- March 9, 2019
Nominee	Abubakar Atiku Bagudu	Isa Mohammed Galaudu
Party	APC	PDP
Running mate	Samaila Dabai Yombe	Abubakar Malam
Popular vote	673,717	106,633
Governor before election
Abubakar Atiku Bagudu
APC
Elected Governor
Abubakar Atiku Bagudu
APC

The 2019 Kebbi State gubernatorial election occurred in Nigeria on March 9, 2019. Incumbent APC Governor Abubakar Atiku Bagudu won re-election for a second term, defeating Isa Galaudu of the PDP.

Abubakar Atiku Bagudu won the primary election after he was returned as the sole candidate. He picked Manasseh Daniel Jatau as his running mate. Usman Bayero Nafada was the PDP candidate with Charles Yau Iliyas as his running mate. 32 candidates contested in the election.

== Electoral system ==
The Governor of Kebbi State is elected using the plurality voting system.

== Primary election ==
=== APC primary ===
Abubakar Atiku Bagudu won the primary election after he was returned as the sole candidate. He picked Samaila Dabai Yombe as his running mate.

=== PDP primary ===
The PDP primary election was held on September 30, 2018. Isa Mohammed Galaudu won the primary election polling 1,072 votes against 3 other candidates. His closest rival was Umar Tafida who came second with 720 votes, Buhari Bala came third with 322 votes, while Abubakar had 28 votes.

== Results ==
A total number of 32 candidates registered with the Independent National Electoral Commission to contest in the election.

The total number of registered voters in the state was 1,789,975, while 820,078 voters were accredited. Total number of votes cast was 814,084, while number of valid votes was 793,388. Rejected votes were 20,696.

Candidate	Party	Votes	%
Abubakar Atiku Bagudu	All Progressives Congress	673,717	84.92
Isa Mohammed Galaudu	People's Democratic Party	106,633	13.44
Other candidates		13,038	1.64
Total		793,388	100.00
Valid votes		793,388	97.46
Invalid/blank votes		20,696	2.54
Total votes		814,084	100.00
Registered voters/turnout		1,789,975	45.48
Source: DailyPost

=== By local government area ===
Here are the results of the election by local government area for the two major parties. The total valid votes of 793,388 represents the 32 political parties that participated in the election. Blue represents LGAs won by Abubakar Atiku Bagudu. Green represents LGAs won by Isa Mohammed Galaudu.

LGA	Abubakar Atiku Bagudu APC		Isa Mohammed Galaudu PDP		Total votes
LGA	#	%	#	%	#
Yauri	25,011		1,574		
Arewa	35,991		10,994		
Gwandu	30,720		4,526		
Birnin Kebbi	79,092		6,010		
Argungu	30,101		23,397		
Aleiro	21,923		3,479		
Suru	39,359		5,198		
Shanga	27,012		3,506		
Kalgo	21,899		805		
Augie	28,479		11,875		
Bunza	23,980		2,114		
Dandi	33,315		5,929		
Dandi	33,315		5,929		
Sakaba	19,182		1,746		
Zuru	25,507		4,578		
Jega	53,807		1,774		
Maiyama	40,217		1,477		
Bagudo	41,556		2,581		
Ngaski	20,917		5,516		
Fakai	14,722		3,729		
Wasagu/Danko	29,625		4,609		
Koko/Besse	31,392		1,216		
Totals	673,717		106,633		793,388
