= Ibrahim Bello Mohammad =

Nigerian politician

Ibrahim Bello Mohammed

Member of House of Representative
- Incumbent
- In office June 2015 – June 2019
- Constituency: Birnin-Kebbi/Kalgo/Bunza Federal Constituency

Personal details
- Born: May 15, 1996 (age 30)
- Party: peoples Democratic party, (PDP)
- Occupation: Politician

Ibrahim Bello Mohammed, also known as IBM, (born 15 may, 1996). He is a Nigerian politician serving as the Member representing the Birnin-Kebbi/Kalgo/Bunza Federal Constituency in the 10th National House of Representative. He is presently the youngest member of this assembly.

== Background and early life ==
Ibrahim was born on the 15th of May, 1996. He is from Kebbi state.

== Personal life ==
Mohammad is from a family rooted in politics, he is the son is Haliru Mohammed Bello, a former national chairman of the peoples Democratic party, (PDP).

== Education ==
Bello attended the Regent Secondary School in Abuja.

== Political career ==
Ibrahim stepped into politics, after the demise of his elder brother, Abba Bello Muhammad, on January 3, 2023, this happened a few days before the 2023 general elections. He is a member representing the Birnin-Kebbi/Kalgo/Bunza Federal Constituency in the 10th National House of Representative under the umbrella of the People's Democratic party.
