= Bello Kaoje =

Nigerian politician (born 1972)

Bello A. Kaoje

Member of House of Representatives
- In office 2011–Incumbent
- Constituency: Bagudo/Suru Federal Constituency

Personal details
- Born: June 15, 1972 (age 54)
- Party: All Progressive Congres
- Occupation: Politician

Bello Kaoje (born June 15, 1972) is a Nigerian politician representing the Bagudo/Suru Federal Constituency of Kebbi State in the House of Representatives. He hail from the Bagudo local government area.

== Political career ==
In 2011, he became a member of the National House of Representatives elected to represent the Bagudo/Suru Federal Constituency. He served as the Chairman of the House Committee on Agricultural Production and Services. He is a member of the All Progressive Congress.

== Constituency development ==
Kaoje has initiated rural electrification, ICT training programs, classroom construction, skills acquisition centers, and agricultural support. He also worked on improving border security and supported the renovation of the Sarkin Bargu’s palace.
