= Rabiu Garba-Kamba =

Nigerian politician

Federal Representative
- Preceded by: Umar Abdullahi Kamba
- Constituency: Arewa/Dandi

Personal details
- Party: All Progressive Congress (APC)
- Occupation: Politician

Rabiu Garba Kamba is a Nigerian politician. He currently serves as the Federal Representative representing Arewa/Dandi constituency of Kebbi State in the 10th National Assembly. He succeeded Umar Abdullahi Kamba.
