= 2011 Nigerian Senate elections in Kebbi State =

2011 Nigerian Senate election in Kebbi State

The 2011 Nigerian Senate election in Kebbi State was held on April 9, 2011, to elect members of the Nigerian Senate to represent Kebbi State. Isah Mohammed Galaudu representing Kebbi North, Abubakar Atiku Bagudu representing Kebbi Central and Mohammed Magoro representing Kebbi South all won on the platform of Peoples Democratic Party.

== Overview ==
Affiliation	Party		Total
Affiliation	PDP	ACN	Total
Before Election			3
After Election	3	–	3

== Summary ==
District	Incumbent	Party	Elected Senator	Party
Kebbi North			Isah Mohammed Galaudu	PDP
Kebbi Central			Abubakar Atiku Bagudu	PDP
Kebbi South			Mohammed Magoro	PDP

== Results ==
=== Kebbi North ===
Peoples Democratic Party candidate Isah Mohammed Galaudu won the election, defeating other party candidates.

2011 Nigerian Senate election in Kebbi State
Party	Candidate	Votes	%
PDP	Isah Mohammed Galaudu		
Total votes			
PDP hold			

=== Kebbi Central ===
Peoples Democratic Party candidate Abubakar Atiku Bagudu won the election, defeating other party candidates.

2011 Nigerian Senate election in Kebbi State
Party	Candidate	Votes	%
PDP	Abubakar Atiku Bagudu		
Total votes			
PDP hold			

=== Kebbi South ===
Peoples Democratic Party candidate Mohammed Magoro won the election, defeating party candidates.

2011 Nigerian Senate election in Kebbi State
Party	Candidate	Votes	%
PDP	Mohammed Magoro		
Total votes			
PDP hold			
