= Umar Abdullahi Kamba =

Nigerian politician

Federal Representative
- Preceded by: Husseni Suleiman
- Succeeded by: Rabiu Garba-Kamba
- Constituency: Arewa Dandi

Personal details
- Party: Peoples Democratic Party (PDP)
- Occupation: Politician

Umar Abdullahi Kamba (born 1968) is a Nigerian politician from Kebbi State. He served as a member representing Arewa Dandi Federal Constituency in the 9th National assembly. He succeeded Husseni Suleiman and was elected into the House of Assembly at the 2019 elections under the Peoples Democratic Party (PDP).
