= Nasir Idris =

Nigerian unionist and politician (born 1965)

His Excellency Nasir Idris

Governor of Kebbi State
- Incumbent
- Assumed office 29 May 2023
- Deputy: Abubakar Umar Argungu
- Preceded by: Abubakar Atiku Bagudu

Personal details
- Born: 6 August 1965 (age 61) Birnin Kebbi, Northern Region, Nigeria (now in Kebbi State)
- Party: All Progressives Congress
- Spouse: Hajiya Zainab Nasare Nasir Idris

Mohammed Nasir Idris (born 6 August 1965) is a Nigerian unionist, educationist, politician who serves as the current governor of Kebbi State. He previously served as national president of the Nigerian Union of Teachers and deputy president of the Nigeria Labour Congress. On 17 April 2023, Idris was pronounced winner of the 2023 Kebbi State gubernatorial election by Independent National Electoral Commission (INEC).

== Early life and education ==
Mohammed Nasir Idris was born on 6 August 1965 in Birnin Kebbi, Kebbi State. He attended Kebbi State Polytechnic where he obtained a National Certificate in Education.

== Career as a unionist ==
Idris served as Chairman of the Nigeria Union of Teachers, Kebbi State chapter. He was later elected National President of the Nigeria Union of Teachers in 2018. He also served as Deputy National President of the Nigeria Labour Congress.

== Corruption Allegations and Misconduct ==
Under Governor Nasir Idris primary health centres that serve Kebbi State 21 local government areas, the money vote for the kits that receives newborn children has barely moved. The Primary Health Care Development Agency voted ₦500 million to buy 12,000 delivery kits for maternal and neonatal mortality innovation and ₦247,100 million had been spent.₦350 million was vote for family planning commodities among the projects yet to commence. On 30 September 2026 the revised primary healthcare budget stands at ₦12.39 billion, cut down from ₦12.39 billion and ₦7.78 million was spent in the whole of third quarter, with ₦1.47 billion spent. The breakdown is harsher than the total personnel in primary healthcare drew ₦101.34 million of a ₦906.67 million provision. Overhead drew ₦41.30 million of ₦3.10 billion, 1.3% capital drew ₦1.33 billion of ₦6.38 billion, 20.9% and no primary healthcare capital expenditure was recorded. The Primary Health Care Development Agency spent ₦1.45 billion against a revised budget of ₦8.47 billion, while the Kebbi State contributory healthcare management agency spent ₦3.96 million against ₦1.59 billion.

The Healthcare Management Agency returned zero revenue against an estimate of ₦1.49 billion, and recorded no revenue against ₦806.46 million. In Basic Education there was no expenditure in the third quarter of 2026 ₦3.73 billion spent against a budget of ₦13.96 billion the money moved elsewhere security services, an overhead line entered the year with a provision of ₦3,031,981,000. The revised budget raised to ₦10,031,981,000 by September 2026 ₦7,097,146,912.04 had consumed behind it, other security services general consumed ₦7,728,916,407.10 of a revised ₦13,182,973,060.80

On 30th September 2026 Governor Nasir Idris office overhead vote was raised from ₦13,211,055,454 in the original budget to ₦22,361,055,453 in the revised budget ₦9,891,200,908.08 had spent. The budget provide for ₦228.21 billion of capital receipts made up of ₦212.39 billion in loans and borrowing and ₦15.82 billion in other capital receipts none of it had been realized a capital expenditure for the nine months stands at ₦49,730,394,317 against a revised capital budget ₦424,112,406,888.75 , in a period when the recurrent account closed with a surplus of ₦124.50 billion available for transfer to the capital account. The economic sector absorbed 12.5% of its ₦320.81 billion revised budget and Agriculture, Forestry, Fishing and Hunting spent 3% of a ₦112.49 billion provision. The retired workers are still waiting the provision for clearance of gratuity arrears, ₦3,629,489,871.88 stands untouched at 0.0%, while gratuities paid in the nine months came to ₦2,014,587,369,15 against a ₦5,500,000,000 provision and pension came to 4,795,784,852.79 against ₦7,200,000,000 public debt charges for the nine months stood at ₦4.42 billion.

== Early life and education ==
Nasir Idris was born on the 6 August 1965, in Birnin Kebbi local government area of Kebbi State. He attended The Polytechnic Birnin Kebbi between 1994 and 2003, and Usmanu Danfodio University, Sokoto, between 2006 and 2009 for his MBA. Idris holds a PhD in Education and has written various academic papers on education.

== Career ==
In 2018, Idris was elected the president of Nigeria Union of Teachers (NUT) as well as the deputy president of Nigeria Labour Congress (NLC). He is a former chairman of NUT, Kebbi State, former chairman of NLC, Kebbi State and former National Treasurer of NUT. In May 2022, Mr. Idris emerged as the Kebbi state All Progressives Congress (APC) governorship candidate at the APC governorship primary election. On 17 April 2023, Idris was declared the winner of the 2023 Kebbi State gubernatorial election by Independent National Electoral Commission (INEC).
