= 2019 Nigerian Senate elections in Kebbi State =

2019 Nigerian Senate election in Kebbi State

The 2019 Nigerian Senate election in Kebbi State was held on February 23, 2019, to elect members of the Nigerian Senate to represent Kebbi State. Bala Ibn Na'allah representing Kebbi South, Adamu Aliero representing Kebbi Central and Abdullahi Abubakar Yahaya representing Kebbi North all won on the platform of All Progressives Congress.

== Overview ==
Affiliation	Party		Total
Affiliation	PDP	APC	Total
Before Election	0	3	3
After Election	0	3	3

== Summary ==
District	Incumbent	Party	Elected Senator	Party
Kebbi South	Bala Ibn Na'allah	APC	Bala Ibn Na'allah	APC
Kebbi Central	Adamu Aliero	APC	Adamu Aliero	APC
Kebbi North	Abdullahi Abubakar Yahaya	APC	Abdullahi Abubakar Yahaya	APC

== Results ==
=== Kebbi South ===
A total of 9 candidates registered with the Independent National Electoral Commission to contest in the election. APC candidate Bala Ibn Na'allah won the election, defeating PDP candidate, Benjamin Ezra Dikki and 7 other party candidates. Na'allah scored 136,287 votes, while PDP candidate Dikki scored 62,733 votes.

2019 Nigerian Senate election in Kebbi State
Party	Candidate	Votes	%
APC	Bala Ibn Na'allah	136,287	
PDP	Benjamin Ezra Dikki	62,733	
Others			
Total votes		202,457	100%
APC hold			

=== Kebbi Central ===
A total of 24 candidates registered with the Independent National Electoral Commission to contest in the election. APC candidate Adamu Aliero won the election, defeating PDP candidate Abubakar Shehu-Abubakar and 22 other party candidates. Aliero pulled 232,000 votes, while PDP candidate Abubakar scored 75,638.

2019 Nigerian Senate election in Kebbi State
Party	Candidate	Votes	%
APC	Adamu Aliero	232,000	
PDP	Abubakar Shehu-Abubakar	75,638	
Others			
Total votes		316,136	100%
APC hold			

=== Kebbi North ===
A total of 15 candidates registered with the Independent National Electoral Commission to contest in the election. APC candidate Abdullahi Abubakar Yahaya won the election, defeating PDP candidate, Usman Bello Suru. Yahaya pulled 170,624 votes while his closest rival Suru pulled 66,815 votes.

2019 Nigerian Senate election in Kebbi State
Party	Candidate	Votes	%
APC	Abdullahi Abubakar Yahaya	170,624	
PDP	Usman Bello Suru	66,815	
Others			
Total votes		240,745	100%
APC hold			
