= Buhari Bala =

Nigerian Chartered accountant and politician (born 1958)

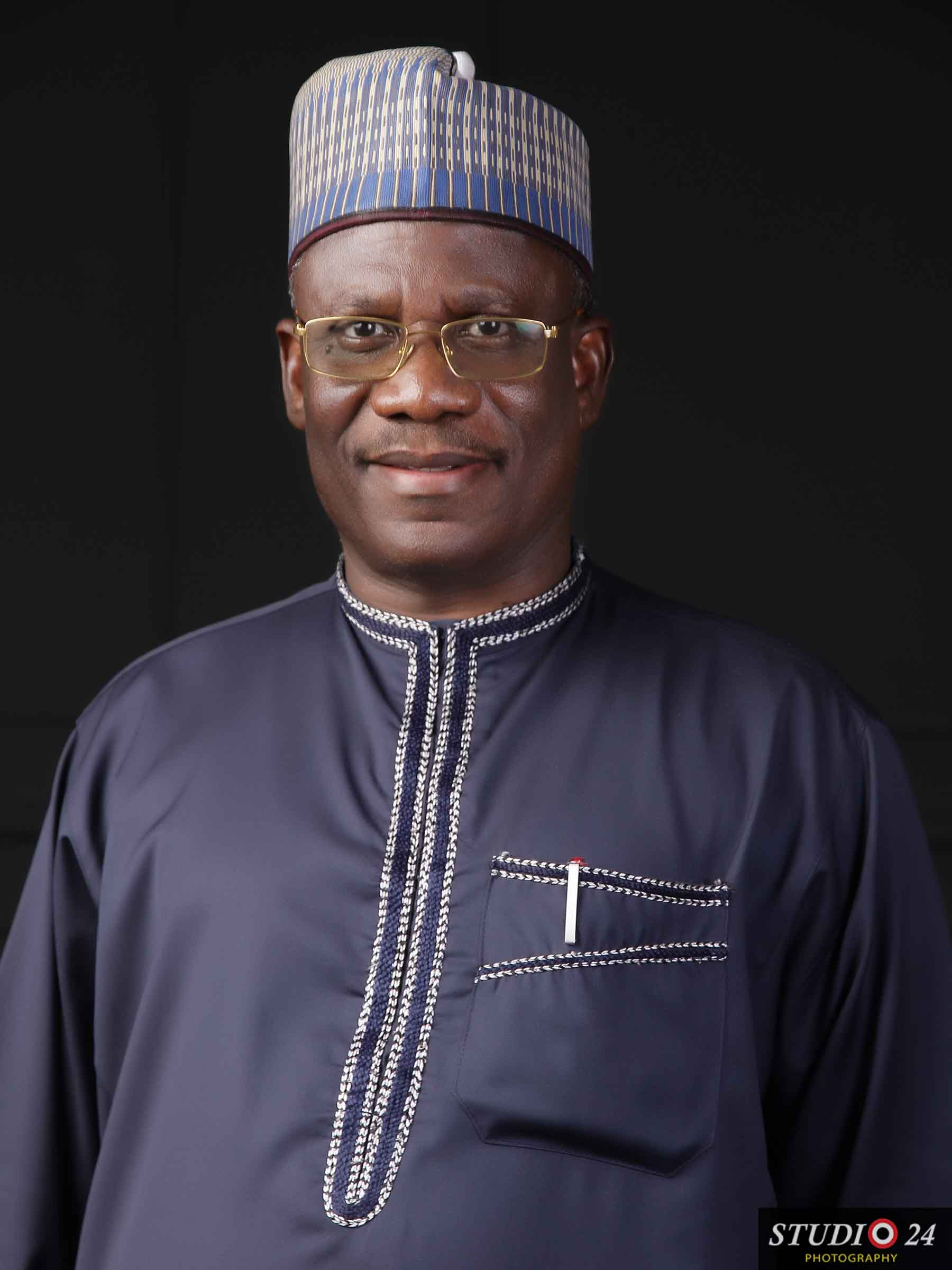

Former Federal Minister of Foreign Affairs (State), Nigeria
- In office 1997 – May 1999

Personal details
- Born: 2 July 1958 (age 68) Kebbi, Nigeria
- Education: Ahmadu Bello University; Luton University
- Profession: Chartered accountant

Buhari Bala (born 2 July 1958) is a Nigerian Chartered accountant and politician who served as Nigeria's Minister of State for Foreign Affairs from 1997 until the transition to civil rule in 1999. Bala is a recipient of the Nigerian National Honour- Order of the Federal Republic (OFR) conferred by former President Goodluck Jonathan, and the second highest national honours award of Libya- Medal Of Bravery, in recognition of his numerous contributions in the field of International Politics and Relations and for the promotion of Nigeria – Libya bilateral relations. Prior to working for the Nigerian Government, he served as Director, Finance and Supply at the Ministry of Health in Sokoto State, Nigeria.

== Early life and education ==
Buhari Bala was born in Birnin Kebbi, Kebbi State as a tenth child of 24 children. He attended Central Primary School B/Kebbi and obtained the West African School Certificate from the Federal Government College Ilorin in 1977 and thereafter proceeded to the Ahmadu Bello University, Zaria where he obtained a Bachelor of Science Degree in Business Administration in 1981 and thereafter a Masters in Business Administration (MBA) in 1984 from the same institution. Bala also has a Diploma in Advanced Accounting from Luton University in the United Kingdom.

== Career ==
Bala began his career in the Ministry of Finance in the old Sokoto State, where he rose to become the Financial Controller for the Ministry having overall responsibility of implementation of budget expenditure. He was at different times Director, Finance and Supplies in the Directorate of Foods, Roads and Rural Infrastructure and also in the Ministry of Health. He then moved to Peugeot Automobile Nigeria as an Internal Audit Manager, Treasury Manager and subsequently rose to the position of Assistant General Manager (Finance) in charge of Treasury and International Operations and also Head of Lagos Operations. His career in both public and private sector in Nigeria spans close to 30 years,

In 1997, he was appointed by the then Military Head of State of Nigeria, Late General Sani Abacha as Minister of State for Foreign Affairs until the return to civil rule in 1999. He is the Principal Partner, Buhari Bala and Company a foremost firm of Chartered Accountants. He sits on the board of several companies including Aso Water International, Simtex International Nig Ltd and Buhari Bala Foundation for Youth Empowerment. He was previously on the board of Nigerian Shippers Council and Metropolitan Merchant Bank.

== Minister of Foreign Affairs ==
As Minister of State for Foreign Affairs, Bala had responsibility for the overall administration of the Ministry of Foreign Affairs, along with the Minister for Foreign Affairs. He was responsible for formulation and execution of Nigeria's foreign policy at a very difficult period of the country's development and foreign relations. He oversaw Nigeria's foreign relations for Africa, Middle East, Eastern Europe and Asia. He was responsible for overseeing Multi-lateral Bodies, Agencies and Joint Commissions of the Ministry.

== Politics ==
Buhari Bala is a member of the All Progressives Congress and a member of the Board of Trustee of the President Muhammadu Buhari Support Centre Group. He is also the Secretary of the Northern Political Summit Group (G-20) and also Secretary of the Northern Economic Summit. He was previously the National Treasurer of the opposition People's Democratic Party.

== Awards and recognitions ==
- Officer of the Order of the Federal Republic (OFR)
- The 2nd Highest National Honours Award Of Libya- Medal Of Bravery
- The European-American University Honorary Doctorate Degree - Doctor Of Science In Accounting And Financial Management Leadership
- 2012 Kwame Nkrumah Leadership Award
- Ambassador For Peace Award By The Inter-Religious And International Federation For World Peace
