= Sir Yahaya Memorial Hospital =

- Kebbi state government

Geography
- Location: Birnin Kebbi, Kebbi State, Nigeria
- Coordinates: 12.455511°N 4.200038°E

Organisation
- Type: General

Services
- Beds: 290

History
- Opened: 1952

Links
- Website: siryahayahospital.com
- Lists: Hospitals in Nigeria

Sir Yahaya Memorial Hospital (SYMH) is located in Birnin Kebbi, Kebbi State, Nigeria and was built in 1952 with native authority funds. It was commissioned in December 1952 as a general hospital with a maternity and three wards [One male ward and Two female ward].

The first indigenous medical doctor was Dr Lodi and the charge nurse was Mallam Aliyu Lemu while the maternity unit was staffed by two European nursing sisters.

The hospital is over 290 capacity bedded facility which is headed by a Chief Medical Director (CMD). Management and funding of the general hospital underwent dynamic changes from Gwandu native authority to northern Nigerian government to northwestern state government to Sokoto state government and now Kebbi state government as from August 1991.

On creation of Kebbi state, the general hospital was upgraded to specialist hospital Birnin Kebbi. In the year 1997 specialist hospital was renamed Sir Yahaya Memorial Hospital Birnin Kebbi to immortalize the 17th Emir of Gwandu who had a vision to build a hospital at that time on his farmland without soliciting for compensation.

== Department ==
- Accident and Emergency
- Maternity Unit
- Paediatrics
- Intensive Care Unit
- Dialysis
- Laboratory
- X-ray.
