= Ibrahim Bawa Kamba =

Nigerian politician

Ibrahim Bawa Kamba is a Nigerian politician from Kebbi State, born in July 1954. He served as a member of the National Assembly, representing the Arewa/Dandi Federal Constituency from 2003 to 2007 and again in 2011 to 2015, as a member of the All Nigeria Peoples Party (ANPP).
