= 2015 Kebbi State gubernatorial election =

State election in Nigeria

- 11 April 2015
Nominee	Abubakar Atiku Bagudu	Bello Sarkin Yaki
Party	APC	PDP
Popular vote	477,376	293,443
Governor before election
Usman Saidu Nasamu Dakingari
PDP
Elected Governor
Abubakar Atiku Bagudu
APC

The 2015 Kebbi State gubernatorial election was the 7th gubernatorial election of Kebbi State. Held on 11 April 2015, the All Progressives Congress nominee Abubakar Atiku Bagudu won the election, defeating Bello Sarkin Yaki of the People's Democratic Party.

== APC primary ==
APC candidate, Abubakar Atiku Bagudu clinched the party ticket. The APC primary election was held in 2014.

== PDP primary ==
PDP candidate, Bello Sarkin Yaki clinched the party ticket. The PDP primary election was held in 2014.

== Results ==
A total of 17 candidates contested in the election. Abubakar Atiku Bagudu from the All Progressives Congress won the election, defeating Bello Sarkin Yaki from the People's Democratic Party. Registered voters was 1,454,369, accredited voters was 873,542, 34,875 votes was cancelled, votes cast was 813,239, valid votes was 778,364. The winner, Abubakar Atiku Bagudu won in 19 out of 21 Local Government Areas in the State, Bello Sarkin Yaki won just 2 Local Government Areas.

2015 Kebbi State gubernatorial election
Party	Candidate	Votes	%	±%
APC	Abubakar Atiku Bagudu	477,376		
PDP	Bello Sarkin Yaki	293,443		
APC hold				
