= Garba Maidoki =

Senator from Kebbi South Senatorial District in the 10th Senate

Garba Musa Maidoki is a Nigerian politician and Senator-elect for the 10th Senate from Kebbi South Senatorial District. Running on the ticket of People's Democratic Party, PDP, in the February 25, 2023 Senate election, he polled 75,232 votes to defeat incumbent Senator Bala Ibn Na’Allah of the All Progressives Congress, APC who scored 70,785 votes.
