= Mohammed Magoro =

Nigerian politician

Major General Mohammed Magoro

Senator for Kebbi South
- Incumbent
- Assumed office May 2011
- Preceded by: Abubakar Tanko Ayuba

Minister of Internal Affairs
- In office Jan 1984 – Aug 1985
- Preceded by: Iya Abubakar
- Succeeded by: John Shagaya

Personal details
- Born: 7 May 1941 (age 85)
- Party: People's Democratic Party (PDP)
- Education: Provincial Secondary School, Bida; Indian Military Academy

Military service
- Allegiance: Nigeria
- Branch/service: Nigerian Army
- Rank: Major General

Mohammed Magoro (born 7 May 1941) is a retired Major General of the Nigerian army who was twice a government minister, under Generals Obasanjo and Buhari. In the April 2011 elections he was elected Senator for the Kebbi South constituency of Kebbi State, Nigeria.

== Early career ==
Magoro was born in Kebbi State, a member of the Zuru ethnic minority.

He was a graduate of Bida Provincial School, a classmate of Mamman Jiya Vatsa and Ibrahim Babangida. He joined the Nigerian Army on 10 December 1962 alongside Ibrahim Babangida and Sani Abacha, when he enrolled at the Nigeria Military Training College.

== Military regime ==
Magoro was appointed Federal Commissioner of Transport during the Military administration of General Olusegun Obasanjo in 1978. He became Minister for Internal Affairs under Major General Muhammadu Buhari, the military ruler from January 1984 to August 1985.

He was also a member of the Supreme Military Council.

As Minister for Internal Affairs, in May 1985 he oversaw the exodus of close to a million foreign nationals from Nigeria. Half had come from Ghana, and the rest from other West African countries where they were escaping from drought and starvation.

Magoro was not retained as minister under Ibrahim Babangida's new regime which took power in August 1985, but was appointed head of the Nigerian National Shipping Line, the Nigerian Railways and Nigerian Ports Authority.

After his retirement in 1995 he took to public service and thereafter became the Chairman of Ocean and Oil Services Ltd.

== Fourth republic ==
Magoro became Chairman of the Oando group in 2000, a petroleum marketing company created through privatization of Unipetrol Nigeria Plc., in which Ocean and Oil Services bought a major share.

In November 2001 Magoro was an influential member of the Board of Trustees of the People's Democratic Party (PDP).

In the run up to the April 2007 elections for Kebbi State governor, Magoro was at first declared the PDP candidate but later was replaced by Alhaji Saidu Dakingari. When Dakingari went on to be elected, the rival parties disputed the validity of the election on the basis that he had been filed as a candidate on 5 February 2007 but had not formally joined the party until 10 February 2007.

== Senatorial career ==
In the January 2011 PDP primary election in Zuru for Senatorial candidate for Kebbi South, Magoro defeated the incumbent, Senator Tanko Ayuba. Mogoro won the election on 9 April 2011 with 125,940. The runner-up was Abubakar S. Yelwa of the Congress for Progressive Change (CPC), who won 94,147 votes.
