= Bala Ibn Na'allah =

Nigerian politician (born 1967)

Bala Ibn Na'allah (born June 2, 1962 in Zuru, Kebbi State) is a Nigerian politician and senator. He is representing Kebbi South Senatorial seat in the Senate of Nigeria and was the Deputy Majority leader in the 8th Nigerian senate. On August 29, 2021, Na'allah's eldest son, Abdulkarim Bala Na'Allah was murdered by unknown assailants in his residence in Kaduna state. In 2023, Na'allah lost his reelection to the Senate as he was defeated by Garba Maidoki who polled 75,232 votes while Na'allah scored 70,785.

== Early life and education ==
Bala Ibn Na'Allah had his first elementary education in Yewande Primary school in Surulere, Lagos State. Subsequently, he went to Cape flying school in South Africa and successfully completed his commercial pilot license when he was 17, this marked the beginning of his professional journey as a pilot. Na'Allah was not able to take his check-ride until December 2008 due to being underaged. He proceeded to Ahmadu Bello University, where he Obtained a bachelor's degree in law (LLB) and became a Legal Practitioner.

== Political career ==
Senator Bala Ibn Na'Allah revealed how Joined Nigerian politics in an exclusive interview with TVC journalist in the year 2003 through Distinguished Senator Muhammad Adamu Aliero CON, the then governor of Kebbi State, on their coincidence journey to mecca. Sen Bala contested and won his first political bidding to the National Assembly as early as 2003, where he was elected to represent the people of Zuru constituency from 2003 to 2011. More so, suddenly after the emergence of All Progressive Congress (APC) as an opposition party in 2014, he joined the force and won senatorial seat to the red chamber, representing Kebbi South under the same APC.

== National Assembly ==
- He was a member of an Ad-Hoc committee on the convocation of stakeholders meeting for Rafting NNS Aradu which yielded a positive outcome.
- He was a former Deputy majority leader in the Red Chamber of the Nigerian National Assembly.
- He was the chairman of the senate committee on Air force due to his exposure and foresight in the sector.
- He was also a member of Ad-hoc committee of Legislative agenda that fast-track bills in the NASS in the year 2015.
- He also proposed the bill to regulate misinformation among the citizens through social media regulations.
- He sponsored the motion to Surmount all kinds of criminal actions by Kidnappers and terrorists in Kebbi state and Nigeria at whole which was co-sponsored by 12 twelve other senators.
- He Co-sponsored the urgent need motion to resuscitate the Nigerian Navy flagship "NNS Aradu"
- He was Nominated for the Vice President candidacy of the Pan African Parliament (PAP) representing the West Africa Region.

== Constituency projects ==
- Sen Bala Ibn Allah built and handed over five classrooms' blocks.
- Donated a two floor a primary health care facility to the people of Kanya, Dank-wasagu LGA in his state which was inaugurated by the Governor Abubakar Atiku Bagudu.
- He donated two emergency medical ambulance and a passenger boat to Yauri, Sharya and Ngaska LGA of Kebbi State.

== Family ==
Senator Na'Allah has a family of five, and only his wife doesn't fly aircraft in the family, On the day of Nigerians woke up to a tradegedy of Abdulkarims Murder, first son of Bala Ibn Na'Allah in his Kaduna City Residence.
