= Abubakar Atiku Bagudu =

Nigerian politician (born 1961)

Abubakar Atiku Bagudu CON

Minister of Budget and Economic Planning
- Incumbent
- Assumed office 21 August 2023
- President: Bola Tinubu
- Preceded by: Zainab Ahmed

Governor of Kebbi State
- In office 29 May 2015 – 29 May 2023
- Deputy: Samaila Yombe Dabai
- Preceded by: Usman Saidu Nasamu Dakingari
- Succeeded by: Nasir Idris

Senator for Kebbi Central
- In office 2009 – 29 May 2015
- Preceded by: Adamu Aliero
- Succeeded by: Adamu Aliero

Personal details
- Born: 26 December 1961 (age 64)
- Party: All Progressives Congress (2014–present)
- Other political affiliations: Peoples Democratic Party (before 2014)
- Education: Usmanu Danfodiyo University; University of Jos
- Occupation: Politician

Abubakar Atiku Bagudu CON (born 26 December 1961) is a Nigerian politician who is the Nigerian minister of budget and economic planning. He served as governor of Kebbi State from 2015 to 2023. He also served as the senator representing the Kebbi Central senatorial district from 2009 to 2015.

== Life and education ==
Atiku Bagudu is from a wealthy family, his father was the director of Primary education in Kebbi State. He obtained a BSc (Economics) degree from Usmanu Danfodiyo University, Sokoto, Msc (Economics) from the University of Jos and M.A. (International Affairs). He is married to Zainab Bagudu.

== Political career ==
In 2009, Bagudu succeeded Adamu Aliero when he won the by-election for the Kebbi Central Senatorial seat following Aliero's appointment by President Goodluck Jonathan to become the Minister for FCT in December 2008.

In the 6 April 2011 elections, Bagudu won for the PDP with 173,595 votes. His predecessor Adamu Aliero, who had moved to the Congress for Progressive Change (CPC), came second with 137,299 votes and Aliyu Bello Mohammed of the Action Congress of Nigeria (ACN) trailed with 11,953 votes.

During the 2015 general elections, Atiku Bagudu moved from the ruling PDP to the All Progressives Congress (APC) and contested in the governorship election, winning a landslide victory in the polls.

In the 9 March 2019 Kebbi State gubernatorial election, Bagudu polled 673,717 votes, while his rival Sen. Isah Galaudu of PDP polled 106,633 votes.

Bagudu contested and won the ticket of the All Progressives Congress (APC) for the 2023 Kebbi Central Senatorial election. He lost the election to PDP incumbent Adamu Aliero who had previously moved from the APC, after losing the primaries.

He was appointed minister of budget and economic planning by president Bola Tinubu on 16 August 2023

== Major Achievements as Governor ==
Immediately the new sworn in Governor took to the task of sanitising the government of Kebbi State. He sought to streamline government processes and protocols and to recover lost and stolen government properties including monies. He also launched the exercise to grid the Kebbi State civil service of ghost workers. As Atiku Bagudu arrived the seat of Governor, he meet a Kebbi State that have been poorly managed. Over 1.2 million children's were reported be out of school, jobless youths roamed the street, non - functional hospital and local government areas that has totally collapsed. The Atiku Bagudu administration was quick to grab the bull by the horns without allowing for precious time to waste away. He derived into the nitty - gritty to set the committee task force for the recovery of lost and stolen government properties and monies. The committee task force was able to discover billions of naira to the state monies that the governor put to work immediately by reinventing into the state by creating casting infrastructure such, as Roads, International standards schools, Water treatment plant, Hospitals, Upgrades and refurbishments, Agriculture and farming, Power and water supply to rural communities, and other critical sectors of the state. Atiku Bagudu was the pioneer of Treasury Single Account (TSA) In Kebbi State.

=== Revamping Healthcare ===
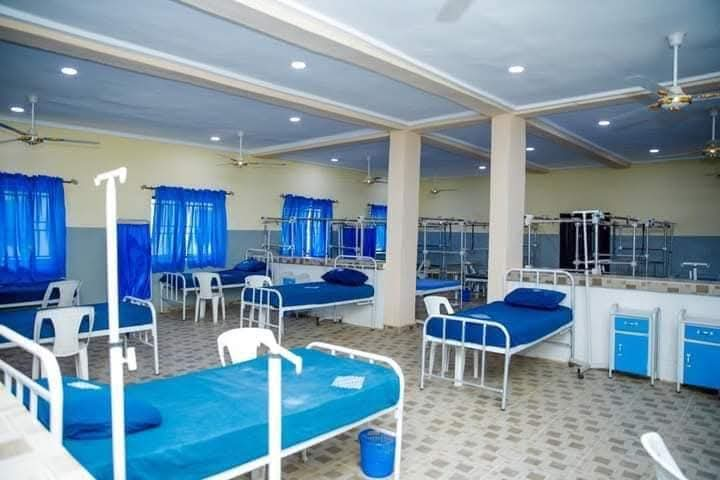
Governor Atiku Bagudu Commission and Established New Wards at Sir Yahaya Hospital Birnin Kebbi Published by Umar Kabir Umar

The Atiku Bagudu administration In Kebbi State launched a major campaign to revamp and upgrade the Healthcare delivery system In Kebbi State. His administration began with healthcare infrastructure within the eight years 230 Primary Healthcare Centers were either Constructed, Renovated, Upgraded, and fully equipped across the rural communities during those years. He inaugurate the state contributory healthcare scheme to boost access to affordable healthcare service by vulnerable people in the state. On 28 May 2019 he rehabilitated 24 Primary Healthcares In Kebbi State. Atiku Bagudu administration Constructed 2 block at Sir Yahaya Memorial Hospital comprising a Paediatric medical word. He rehabilate Hospitals across the 21 local government areas in Kebbi State, he renovated Kebbi Medical Centre, Kalgo. He inaugurate primary healthcare care steering and operational committees, his administration launched a new consumer food safety evidence and action toward safe nutrition food (eatsafe) In collaboration of USAID .

=== Revolution in Road Construction ===
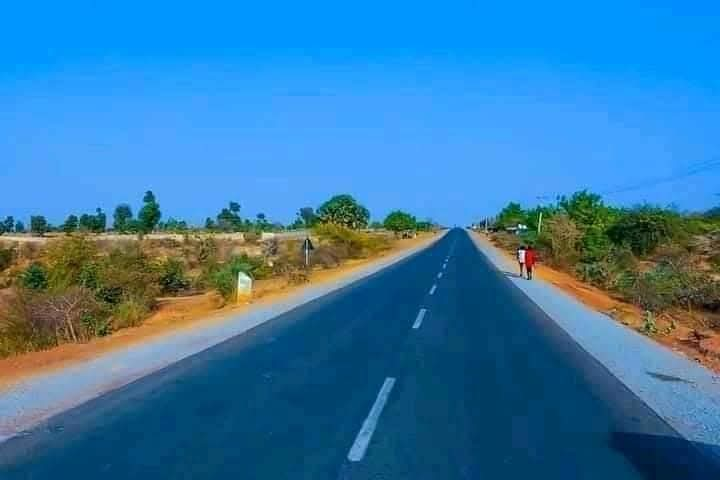
Governor Atiku Bagudu Costruct 17 km Road in Augie Published by Umar Kabir Umar

In his eight years of tenure (as of 2015) as Governor of Kebbi State, Atiku Bagudu has constructed over 200 kilometers of road, crossing urban and rural communities and farmlands. Atiku Bagudu's administration has constructed road and drainage at Bayan Oando and Tipper Garage area of Birnin Kebbi, Unguwan Zabarmawa Birnin Kebbi, and another one Behind Old CID office, Malluwa and Rafin Atiku Area. Constructed Five Kilometers Township Jega, Road, Babuche - Bayawa Road, Augie - Zagi Boarder Road, Ka'oje - Illo Road, Badariya - Kola - Zuguru - Road, Filin Sarki Nepa Road. His administration rehabilitated the Rima roundabout and five roundabout across the Kebbi State. Atiku Bagudu administration Constructed access road and drainage at Tsohon Gari and Gwadangwaji, 2.56 km access road to Ambursa, Repairs two bridges at Baban Jori Giede and Baba - Dan yaku Village. The construction of Falale - Barama - Badariya Argungun Bye Pas Road, Aliero - Gehuru Road.

=== Government Through Empowerment Programmes ===
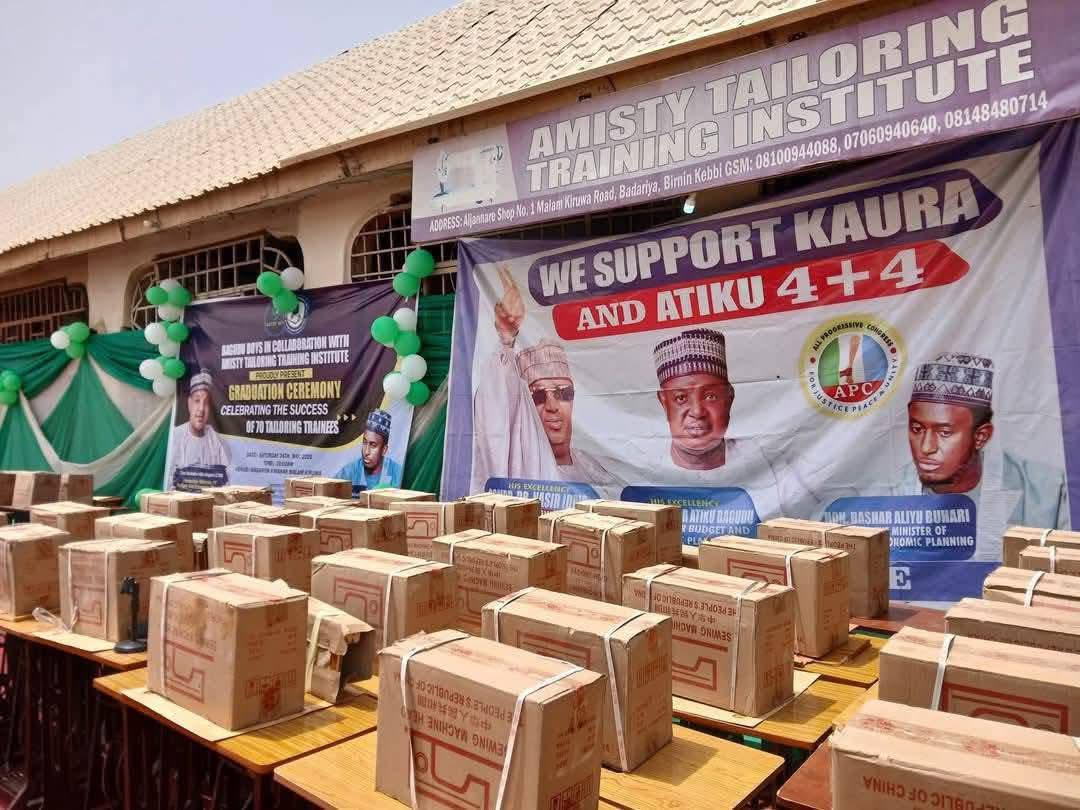
Atiku Bagudu and his Special Adviser Hon Bashar Aliyu Buhari ( Alherin Gwandu) Empower Youths Male and Female With Sewing Machines and Tailoring Training in Kebbi State. Published by Umar Kabir Umar

Atiku Bagudu administration under the auspices of the Atiku Bagudu economic and empowerment programs in the history of Kebbi State. Some fruit of the programs included Sustainable Development Programs Goals (SDGs) intervention Programmes with Kebbi State Government spent over 20 billion on it. Atiku Bagudu witnessed the graduation of 2000 youths male and female trained by the state government on skills acquisition. The distribution of 200 commercial buses across the 21 local government areas. He set up a micro grant of 10000 for each petty trader women and founded the micro grant scheme. He launched a 100 million keep initiatives per LGAs for youth and women, another sum of 80 million reserved for soft loan to trader's and artisan . In January 2021 Governor Atiku Bagudu approved 468.5 million for the execution of projects and empowerment programmes under the state ministry of women affairs and social development.

=== Upgrading Education ===
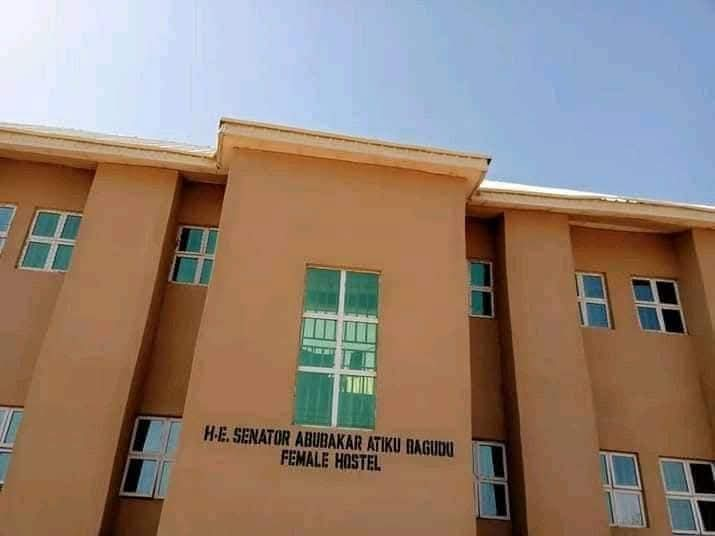
Governor Atiku Bagudu Commission 500 Capacity Male and Female Hostel at College of Education Argungun Published by Umar Kabir Umar

It is understood, the Governor Atiku Bagudu value education, especially girl child education. He views Girl Child Education as a right owned by the government. Atiku Bagudu administration increased the state budgetary allocation to education sector. The educational sector In Kebbi State had suffered serious neglect by previous administrations. Governor Atiku Bagudu has ensured payment of scholarship to students studying in various institutions of higher learning, within the state and outside the state and abroad, including the payment of WAEC and NECO Examination fees for secondary school students. Under his administration three institutions upgraded Adamu Augie College of Education, Argungun, Kebbi State College of Nursing Science and Midwifery, Birnin Kebbi, and the College of Health Technology, Jega get approval to offer Degree programs, HND, and National Diploma (ND). In December 2021 Atiku Bagudu approved foreign training of 262 students of the state to study Medicine and Engineering courses in India, Ukraine and Sudan. More than 33 of Kebbi State University of Science and Technology, Aliero have been received accreditation from National Universities Commission, (NUC). His administration has facilitated the upgrading and transformation of the College of Agriculture, Zuru to Federal University of Agriculture Zuru. He secured the sum of 4 billion naira for the establishment and accreditation of the faculty of engineering at Kebbi State University of Science and Technology, Aliero. Under the State Universal Basic Education Board, SUBEB 518 classrooms have been Constructed while 1,058 classrooms have been renovated, 42,244 furnitures were provided and 450 units of WC toilets were Constructed, 138 boreholes were sunk, 383 wheel Dust Bins to improved water sanitation In schools.

=== Farming ===
In terms of farming, the Atiku Bagudu administration had also prioritised Agriculture as one of its value agenda. Atiku Bagudu administration established Tomatoes paste factory in Ngaski, attracting world acclaimed investors like Dangote Rice Mill and Sugar factory, Kebbi, NNPC ethanol project In Zuru Emirate. Memorandum of understanding between Kebbi State Government and International organization world bank, CBN, NNPC, and Unicef. Under Atiku Bagudu Kebbi State government partner with Egyptian expert in agriculture and livestock production for the development of the state. Launched the Anchor Borrowers Programme to produce food, food creation, increased of six metric tonnes of rice paddies, partnership with lagos state government in the production of Lagos - Kebbi Rice (Lake Rice), Kenya added the Mobilization of over 70,000 farmers, the production of over three million tonnes of rice, Commissioning of WACOT Mill, The administration of Atiku Bagudu distributed 100 tractors, 1000 ox - drawn ploughs, 100 rice threshers, and 100 motorcycles for the trained agriculture extension workers. The Kebbi State with the intervention of world bank has empowerment 5000 person's youths and women's In the Agro - processing productivity enhancement support (APPEALS). Within the eight year Atiku Bagudu administration procured over 50,000 metric tons of fertilizers.

=== Security ===
The Kebbi State government has over time ensured that the security sectors In the state established accountable security institutions which transparently supply institutions security as a public good via. This has led Kebbi State enjoying a peaceful atmosphere as a result of synergy between all the military deployed to the state. Their synergy has reduced endemic crimes such as kidnapping, Banditry, Arm robbery, and similar social vices. The Atiku Bagudu administration has tackle security challenges in the state through the establishment of tenancy regulatory commission and by providing them the logistics, vehicles, and their allowances to took after their welfare. Atiku Bagudu administration provided more than 500 vehicles to security personnel In Kebbi State .

== Minister of Budget and Economic Planning ==
Bagudu was sworn in on August 21, 2023, as the Minister of Budget and Economic Planning the challenges before him were immense but Bagudu takes major achievements in the ministry. Atiku Bagudu create wealth, provide jobs reduced poverty and improve food security and nutrition. The ministry of budget and economic planning, in collaboration with the Infrastructure Concession Regulatory Commission (ICRC), successfully the casava bio - ethanol value chain in the six (6) geographical zones. The project created over 8,000 direct and indirect jobs. The ministry under the leadership of Atiku Bagudu's has been more efficient with informed budgetting policy adjustment, social impact assessment. He also re - engineered operation excellence such as ensuring independence of the National Bureau of Statistics. He launched revised National Social Protection Policy for the vulnerable citizens to the beneficiaries of various social assistance programs to reduced poverty, improving quality of life. Under the leadership of Atiku Bagudu ministry of budget and economic planning's performance imperative particularly in the areas of economic recovery, jobs creation, and poverty alleviation, food security, facilitating access to capital promoting and harnessing skills, and anti -corruption measures.

=== Employment and Poverty Allegation ===
In 2023 performance reports, Bagudu emphasized the ministry Coordination of the National Poverty Reduction and Growth Strategy (NPRGS), which facilitated jobs creation initiatives across all the 36 states and FCT it disclosed that 67,038 where created in the first implementation phase. Atiku Bagudu led Ministry of Budget and Economic Planning to successfully coordinated the implementation of the NG - CARES Program across the 36 states which seven millions poor and vulnerable households had been impacted by the NG -CARES intervention Program across the 36 states. Under the Atiku Bagudu led administration Nigeria is intensifying its engagement to secure deeper collaboration in technology transfer, skills development, and legal migration - key drivers of the country to achieve a $1 trillion economy by 2030.

=== Strategic Budgetary Allocations ===
Atiku Bagudu and his teams have ensured that resources are allocated to projects based on national priorities and needs . The 2025 budget allocated 4.06 trillion naira to Infrastructure development the highest Infrastructure aims to complete the Abuja - Kaduna railway project and the Lagos - Ibadan rail line, Rehabilitation of the Itakpe - Ajaokuta rail line and construction of 12 stations, buildings and track - laying work at railway ancillary facilities in Agbor, the Lagos - Calabar coastal highway and Sokoto - Badagry highway projects are also given notable allocations. Defence and security got 4.91 trillion naira, Education got 3.5 trillion naira and Health got 2.4 trillion naira.

=== Accountability Through Digital Monitoring ===
Atiku Bagudu and his teams under ministry has tracked and monitored the performance of the federal government projects and funded from the 2023 capital budget appropriation against targets set in the National Development Plan. Over 500 selected projects of federal government implemented in 2023 appropriation were monitored.

== Controversy ==
He was a known associate of former Head of State Nigerian Sani Abacha, who was accused of stealing more than $2.2 billion of public funds during his five-year tenure as Nigerian president in the 1990s.

== See also ==
- List of governors of Kebbi State

== Award and Recognition ==
In October 2022, the Nigerian national honour of Commander of the Order of the Niger (CON) was conferred on him by President Muhammadu Buhari.

- CMAN Fellowship Award.
- Public Service Award by President Muhammadu Buhari .
- Award in Agriculture and Food Security by President Muhammadu Buhari .
- Award of Excellence by NLC.
- Foreign Investment Network Award of Excellencency.
- National Award of Excellence by Niger Republic President Mohamed Bazoum.
- Outstanding Support to Education by NUT.
- Sardaunan Yauri.
- The Street Journal's Super Minister for The Month of November 2023.
- National Space Ambassador Award
- Rice Revolution Award by President Muhammadu Buhari.
- NIMASA's Night of Recognition.
