= List of governors of Kebbi State =

This is a list of Kebbi State administrators and Governors of Kebbi State. Kebbi State was formed on 27 August 1991, when it was split off from Sokoto State.

Name	Title	Took office	Left office	Party	Notes
Patrick Aziza	Administrator	28 August 1991	January 1992	Military	
Abubakar Musa	Governor	January 1992	November 1993	NRC	
Salihu Tunde Bello	Administrator	9 December 1993	22 August 1996	Military	
John Ubah	Administrator	22 August 1996	August 1998	Military	
Samaila Bature Chamah	Administrator	August 1998	May 1999	Military	
Adamu Aliero	Governor	29 May 1999	29 May 2007	APP; ANPP	
Usman Saidu Nasamu Dakingari	Governor	29 May 2007	29 May 2015	PDP	
Abubakar Atiku Bagudu	Governor	29 May 2015	29 May 2023	APC	
Nasir Idris	Governor	29 May 2023	Incumbent	APC	
