= Aleiro =

Aliero
- LGA and town
- Interactive map of Aliero
- Location within Nigeria
- Country: Nigeria
- State: Kebbi State

Government
  - Local Government Chairman: Abubakar Jada

Area
  - Total: 350 km^{2} (140 sq mi)

Population (2006)
  - Total: 65,973
  - Density: 190/km^{2} (490/sq mi)
- Time zone: UTC+1 (WAT)
- Postal code: 863

Aliero is a town and Local Government Area in Kebbi State, Nigeria.

It has an area of 350 km^{2} and a population of 65,973 at the 2006 census.

The postal code of the area is 863.

== Background ==
The origins of Aliero can be traced back to the late 16th century when it was founded by the Namasawa and Kabawa tribes. In the 17th century, the population of Aliero grew as people from diverse ethnic groups, such as the Bare-bare from Barno, Marina from Nupeland, Zamfarawa from Zamfara, and Wangarawa from Mali, migrated to and settled in the area due to its fertile land.

The name "Aliero" was derived from a Fulani herdsman named Ali Dan Yaro, who annually brought his animals to graze in the nearby Zauro/Ambursa Area and temporarily settled in the region. The transformation of the name from "Ali Yaro" to "Aliero" occurred during the colonial period under British administration.

As the population of Aliero continued to grow due to immigration, a prominent Muslim scholar named Almustapha Hamma, originally from the Wangara tribe in Mali, arrived in the area. He had previously lived in Maratta (now Niger Republic) before moving to Gobir, Karangiya, and Jakurutu in Argungu. Upon his return to Aliero, he was warmly welcomed, and his preaching and practice led to the conversion of many people to Islam. In gratitude, the people of the area appointed him as the leader of Aliero.

Aliero is home to several groups of people. The Kabawa group arrived in the late 17th century, coming from the former Kabi Kingdom under the leadership of Lumu, with a focus on farming. The Dakkarawa tribes settled in the early 18th century, led by Kamso, but later relocated to the village of Kali, 2 km (1.2 mi) away from the western part of Aliero town. The Zamfarawa group also settled in the area, forming their clan. Additionally, a group of Wangarawa, later known as Namasawa, migrated from Mali to spread Islam in Hausaland and eventually settled in Aliero. These historical migrations and settlements have contributed to the development of the area since the precolonial era.

== Geography and Climate ==
Aliero Local Government Area (LGA) boasts an average temperature of 33 degrees Celsius (91 degrees Fahrenheit), accompanied by a humidity level of approximately 35 percent. This region experiences two distinct seasons: the rainy season and the dry season. Notably, the dry season persists for a significantly longer duration, characterized by scorching temperatures and abundant sunshine.

With average high temperatures below 32 °C (90 °F) and low temperatures below 19 °C (66 °F), Aliero has 2 distinct seasons, with January being the coldest and April being the hottest.

The dry season in Aliero is hot and partially cloudy, whereas the wet season is oppressive, hot, and generally cloudy. The average annual temperature fluctuates between 18 °C (64 °F) and 39 °C (103 °F); it is seldom lower or higher than 16 °C (60 °F) or 42 °C (107 °F).

== Economy ==
Aliero LGA possesses a thriving agricultural sector, holding the esteemed position of being the country's largest onion producer. Beyond onions, this locale cultivates a variety of crops, including mangoes, rice, and guineacorn. Moreover, a notable occupation among the residents of Aliero is bonesetting, with a considerable percentage of the population engaged in this profession.

== Localities ==
Towns, Villages in Aleiro Local Government Area.

- Agwada
- Alelu
- Alero
- Birnin Mallam
- Fagada
- Dangaladima I & II
- Gehuru
- Geza
- Jadadi
- Jan Dutsi
- Jiga Birni
- Jiga Makera
- Katanga
- Kimba
- Magajin Gari
- R/Banwa
- S/Fada
- Danwarai
- Rafin Bauna
- D/ Galadima
- Dakal
- Gumbulu
- Kashin Zama Farafa
- Kashin Zama
- Nasarawa
- Tudun Wada
- Sabiyal
- Fada I & II
- U/ Galadima
