= Yahaya Abubakar Abdullahi =

Nigerian politician (born 1950)

Yahaya Abubakar Abdullahi CON
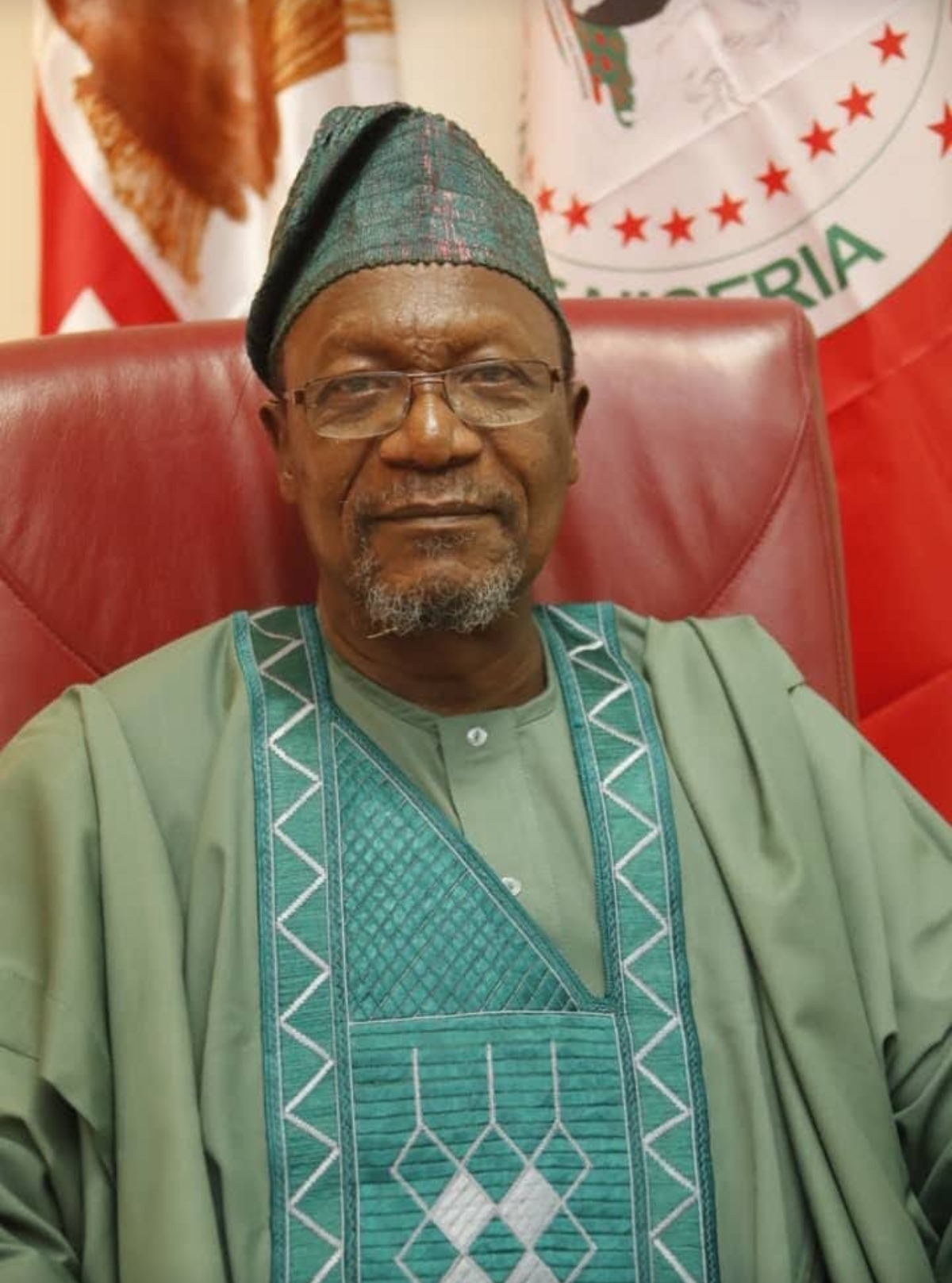

Senate Majority Leader
- In office 3 June 2019 – 8 June 2022
- Preceded by: Ahmad Lawan
- Succeeded by: Abdullahi Ibrahim Gobir

Senator for Kebbi North
- Incumbent
- Assumed office June 2015
- Preceded by: Adamu Baba Augie

Permanent Secretary, Ministry of Niger Delta Affairs
- In office October 2008 – December 2010

Honourable Commissioner for Agriculture and Natural Resources, Sokoto and Kebbi States
- In office 1990–1991

Head of Department, Agricultural Economics and Rural Sociology, Ahmadu Bello University, Zaria (and Member of the University Senate).
- In office 1987–1990

Personal details
- Born: 10 December 1950 (age 75) Argungu, Northern Region, British Nigeria (now in Kebbi State, Nigeria)
- Party: Peoples Democratic Party
- Education: Ahmadu Bello University
- Profession: Associate Professor/Principal Research Fellow, (October 1990)

Yahaya Abubakar Abdullahi CON (born 10 December 1950) is a Nigerian politician and an associate professor. He is the Senator representing Kebbi North Senatorial District of Kebbi State at the 9th National Assembly. He was Senate Majority Leader of the Nigerian 9th National Assembly.

== Early life and education ==
He began his early education at the Dankoji Primary School, Argungu, from 1959 to 1964; after which he attended the Nagarta College, Sokoto, from 1965 to 1969.

Yahaya attended the School of Basic Studies, Ahmadu Bello University, Zaria, Kaduna State, from 1970 to 1971 and continued in the same university to obtain a Bachelor of Science degree in social sciences, and a Doctor of Philosophy Ph.D., in rural sociology from 1976 to 1983. Abdullahi also holds the Certificate of Development Oriented Research in Agriculture, ICRA, Wageningen, The Netherlands, 1985.

== Professional life ==
Prior to his engagement in the Nigerian Civil Service and later politics, Abdullahi was a busy academic at the Faculty of Agriculture, Ahmadu Bello University, Zaria, and the University of Lagos, during which he held various teaching and research positions, namely;

- Honorary Research Fellow in Medical Social Work, (Institute of Child Health, University of Lagos), 1974–1975.
- Graduate Assistant, Institute of Agricultural Research, (IAR), Ahmadu Bello University, Zaria, (January to September, 1976).
- Assistant Research Fellow, ABU, Zaria, (October 1976 to September 1978).
- Research Fellow 2, (October 1978 to 1981).
- Research Fellow 1, (October 1981 to September 1987).
- Senior Research Fellow, (October 1987 to September 1990).
- Associate Professor/Principal Research Fellow, (October 1990).

He taught Rural Sociology, Agricultural Institutions, Extension, Rural Community Institutions and Economic Development at the Faculty of Agriculture, Ahmadu Bello University, Zaria, at undergraduate and post-graduate levels, from 1976 to 1990.

As the head of department, he supervised or co-supervised many masters and doctorate programmes, including the coordination of both teaching and research programmes of the Department of Agricultural Economics and Rural Sociology, Ahmadu Bello University, Zaria, Zaria.

He undertook Rural Development Research independently, jointly and as a member of the Multi-disciplinary Teams, both within and outside Nigeria.

== Political life ==
In the 2015 elections, Abdullahi contested and won the Kebbi North Senatorial seat, on the platform of the All Progressives Congress, APC. In the February 23, 2019 elections, he was announced winner of the Kebbi North Senatorial District election having polled 170,624 votes as Usman Bello Suru of the PDP polled 66,815 votes.

On 3 June 2019, he was announced as the 9th National Assembly Senate Majority Leader.

On 8 June 2022, he officially left the All Progressives Congress, APC to the Peoples Democratic Party, to recontest his present seat at the Senate.

=== Committees ===
- Vice-chairman, Senate Committee on Privatisation.
- Vice-chairman, Senate Committee on FERMA.
- Member, Senate Committee on Public Account.
- Member, Senate Committee on Finance.
- Member, Senate Committee on Niger Delta.
- Member, Senate Committee on Land Transport.
- Member, Senate Committee on Petroleum Downstream.
- Member, Senate Committee on Tertiary Institutions and TETFUND.

== Award ==
In October 2022, a Nigerian National Honour of Commander Of The Order Of The Niger (CON) was conferred on him by President Muhammadu Buhari.
