= Aliero =

Nigerian town in Kebbi State

Coordinates: 12°16′42″N 4°27′6″E

Aliero is a town in northern Nigeria's Kebbi State. Located in the southeast of Kebbi State, the name Aliero was originally from two prominent Fulani scholars Ali & Yero. The town is the headquarters of Aliero Local Government Area.

== Economy ==
Most of the people in Aliero LGA are agrarian, with an emphasis on vegetation, especially onion and pepper. The town has the largest onion market in northwest Nigeria and is a major producer of onions in Nigeria. Aliero residents are known for bone-setting across West and Central Africa. Aliero town is surrounded by mango trees.

== Climate ==
Aliero experiences a tropical continental climate typical of the Sudan–Sahel zone, marked by a long dry season from October to May and a rainy season between June and September. Temperatures remain high for most of the year, and rainfall is generally moderate, supporting the area’s mixed farming activities.

== Notable people ==
- Adamu Aliero
