= Augie, Nigeria =

Augie
- LGA and town
- Interactive map of Augie
- Location in Nigeria
- Coordinates: 12°53′0″N 4°36′0″E
- Country: Nigeria
- State: Kebbi State
- Named for: Short form nickname for August or Augustine

Government
  - Local Government Chairman: Alhaji Yahaya Mohammed Augie

Area
  - Total: 1,185 km^{2} (458 sq mi)

Population (2006)
  - Total: 117,287
- Time zone: UTC+1 (WAT)
- Postal code: 861

Augie is a town and Local Government Area in Kebbi State, Nigeria.

The major language groups are Hausa, Fulani and Zabarma, and the population is predominantly Muslim.

It has an area of 1,185 km^{2} and a population of 117,287 at the 2006 census. The postal code of the area is 861.

== Geography, Climate, Temperature ==
Augie Local Government Area encompasses a total expanse of 1,185 square kilometres or 485 square miles and experiences two well-defined seasons: the rainy season and the dry season. The average temperature in the area hovers around 32 degrees Celsius or 89.6 degrees Fahrenheit, while the humidity level is estimated at 30 percent. Wind speed within Augie LGA typically averages around 7 kilometers per hour or 4.3 miles per hour.

In Augie, the wet season is characterized by high temperatures, muggy conditions, and predominantly cloudy skies. Conversely, the dry season is marked by scorching temperatures and partly cloudy conditions. Throughout the year, the temperature typically ranges from 64 °F to 105 °F, rarely falling below 60 °F or exceeding 108 °F.

The period of intense heat spans approximately 2.2 months, commencing from March 16 and concluding on May 22, with average daily high temperatures consistently surpassing 101 °F. April stands out as the hottest month in Augie, boasting an average high of 104 °F and a low of 81 °F.

Conversely, the cooler season persists for about 2.2 months, running from July 10 to September 17. During this period, average daily high temperatures fall below 91 °F. The chilliest month of the year in Augie is January, recording an average low of 65 °F and a high of 90 °F.

== Economy ==
Agriculture stands as a vital economic pillar of Augie LGA, with substantial cultivation of crops like bananas, mangoes, groundnuts, millet, and sugarcane. Additionally, hunting and cattle rearing play significant roles in the local economy, contributing to its overall economic vitality.

== Localities ==
The local government of Augie is subdivided into ten wards:

1. Augie North
2. Augie South
3. Bayawa North
4. Bayawa South
5. Bagaye/Mera
6. Birnin Tudu/Gudale
7. Bubuce
8. Dundaye/Kwaido/Zaki/Illela
9. Tiggi/Awade
10. Yola
