= Wasagu/Danko =

- LGA
- Interactive map of Wasagu/Danko
- Country: Nigeria
- State: Kebbi State

Area
  - Total: 4,016 km^{2} (1,551 sq mi)

Population (2011)
  - Total: 309,750
- Time zone: UTC+1 (WAT)
- Postal code: 872

Wasagu/Dankomaga is a Local Government Area in Kebbi State, Nigeria. It is named after its two major towns; Wasagu and Donko. Its headquarters is in the town of Ribah.

It has an area of 4,016 km^{2} and a population of 265,203 at the 2006 census.

The postal code of the area is 872.

== Climate ==
Danko–Wasagu has a warm savanna climate with moderate rainfall during the June–September rainy season. The dry season is lengthy and characterized by high temperatures and dry northeasterly winds.
