= Ngaski =

- LGA
- Interactive map of Ngaski
- Country: Nigeria
- State: Kebbi State
- Headquarter: Wara

Government
  - Local Government Chairman: Maniru Abubakar

Area
  - Total: 3,633 km^{2} (1,403 sq mi)

Population (2006)
  - Total: 126,102
  - Density: 34.71/km^{2} (89.90/sq mi)
- Time zone: UTC+1 (WAT)
- Postal code: 870

Ngaski is a Local Government Area in Kebbi State, Nigeria, on the shores of Kainji Lake. Its headquarters are in the town of Wara.

It has an area of 3,633 km^{2} and a population of 126,102 at the 2006 census.

The postal code of the area is 870.

== Climate ==
Ngaski, located near Kainji Lake, experiences a warm tropical climate with slightly higher humidity compared to inland LGAs. Rainfall occurs mainly from June to September, while the dry season remains hot and dominated by Harmattan winds.
