= Maiyama =

- LGA and town
- Interactive map of Maiyama
- Country: Nigeria
- State: Kebbi State

Government
  - sarkin yakin andarai: vice admiral abdullahi mika’ilu
  - Local Government Chairman: Hon. Adamu Aliyu Liba

Area
  - Total: 1,028 km^{2} (397 sq mi)

Population (2006)
  - Total: 175,686
  - Density: 170.9/km^{2} (442.6/sq mi)
- Time zone: UTC+1 (WAT)
- Postal code: 863

Maiyama is a town and Local Government Area in Kebbi State, Nigeria.

It has an area of 1,028 km^{2} and a population of 175,686 at the 2006 census.

The postal code of the area is 863.

== Climate ==
The average annual temperature in Maiyama, Nigeria, which is 1.76% higher than the national average, is 31.22 °C (88.20 °F), which is characteristic of a tropical wet and dry climate.

Because of the growing effects of climate change, Maiyama is seeing an increase in weather variation, including heat waves.

Maiyama features a hot savanna climate with a brief rainy season from June to September. The dry months are prolonged, with high temperatures and dry northeasterly winds common during Harmattan.
