= Dandi, Nigeria =

Coordinates: 12°41′N 8°40′E

Dandi
- LGA
- Interactive map of Dandi
- Country: Nigeria
- State: Kebbi State
- Headquarter: Kamba

Government
  - Local Government Chairman: Mansur Isa
  - Federal House of Representatives member: Rabiu Garba-Kamba

Area
  - Total: 2,003 km^{2} (773 sq mi)

Population (2006)
  - Total: 144,273
  - Density: 72.03/km^{2} (186.6/sq mi)
- Time zone: UTC+1 (WAT)
- Postal code: 862

Dandi is a Local Government Area (LGA) in Kebbi State, Nigeria. Its headquarters are in the town of Kamba. Dandi LGA is home to approximately 135,891 residents, predominantly belonging to the Dendi ethnic sub-division of the Zarm-Songhai peoples. It is bordered by Niger Republic, Bunza Local Government Area, and the Benin Republic. The primary language spoken is Hausa, and Islam is the prevalent religion. Noteworthy festivals in Dandi LGA comprise the Zaro festival and the Kamba fishing festival.

It has an area of 2,003 km^{2} and in 2006 census the population rise to 144,273.

The postal code of the area is 862.

== Districts and Villages ==
Districts, Towns, Villages under Dandi Local Government Area:

- Bani-zumbu
- Maigwaza
- Kamba
- Buma
- Danyaku
- Dole Kaina
- Fana
- Fingilla
- Galaru
- Geza
- Kokani
- Kuka
- Kutu Kullu
- Kwakwaba
- Kyengakwai
- Maidaji
- Maigwaza
- Nayalwa
- Rundu Bussa
- Shiko
- Tungar Rogo
- Unguwar Rafi

== Climatic Condition ==
The environment is changing significantly due to climate change, with different parts of the world being affected differently.

Dandi has a semi-arid climate where rainfall is relatively low and concentrated between June and September. The dry season dominates much of the year, with hot daytime temperatures and dusty Harmattan winds.

== Economy ==
Agriculture plays a vital role in the livelihoods of Dandi Local Government Area residents, encompassing the cultivation of diverse crops. The region's economic activities also encompass fishing, animal husbandry, and trade, facilitated by numerous markets within the Local Government Area where a wide array of goods and services are exchanged between buyers and sellers.
