= Fakai =

- LGA
- Interactive map of Fakai
- Country: Nigeria
- State: Kebbi State
- Headquarter: Mahuta

Government
  - Local Government Chairman: Muhammad Sarkin Fawa

Area
  - Total: 2,247 km^{2} (868 sq mi)

Population (2006)
  - Total: 121,212
  - Density: 53.94/km^{2} (139.7/sq mi)
- Time zone: UTC+1 (WAT)
- 3-digit postal code prefix: 872

Fakai is a Local Government Area in Kebbi State, Nigeria. Its headquarters are in the town of Mahuta.

It has an area of 2,247 km^{2} and a population of 121,212 at the 2006 census.

The postal code of the area is 872.

== Geography ==
Fakai local government area spans across a total area of 2,247 square kilometres or 868 square miles, characterized by two distinct seasons: a lengthy dry season and a brief rainy season. The average temperature in Fakai LGA is approximately 35 degrees Celsius or 95 degrees Fahrenheit, with humidity levels averaging around 22 percent.

=== Climate ===
Fakai lies within the tropical savanna belt and experiences a rainy season from June to September. The dry season is long and hot, with significant temperature variations and low humidity during Harmattan.

== Economy ==
Agriculture serves as the primary occupation for the residents of Fakai LGA, with the cultivation of various crops like onions, rice, millet, and sorghum being a prevalent practice. Furthermore, the rearing of livestock such as cows, goats, and donkeys is also common in this area.

Fakai Local Government Area thrives in trade, boasting several markets where a wide range of commodities are exchanged. The notable Fakai central market is among these bustling trading hubs.

Additionally, Fakai LGA is endowed with mineral resources, including gold, which has attracted several mining companies to the region, further contributing to its economic landscape.

== Localities ==
Towns, Areas, Villages under Fakai Local Government Area. Amiru Bajida Bakara Bangu Buk Ba'uye Bullu

Birnin Tudu

D/Manddanau

Darmi Fakai

Garin Awwal

Garinisa

Gelle

Gulbin Kuka Gullusungu Inga

Kamtu Kwar Magaji Fakai

Mahuta Maikende Makera

Marafa

Matseri

Maijarhula

Penin-Amana

Penin Gaba

Uciri Urgun Yawo

Zussun
