= Adamu Aliero =

Nigerian politician (born 1957)

Senator for Kebbi Central
- Incumbent
- Assumed office 9 June 2015
- Preceded by: Abubakar Atiku Bagudu
- In office 5 June 2007 – 17 December 2008
- Preceded by: Farouk Bello Bunza
- Succeeded by: Abubakar Atiku Bagudu

Minister of the Federal Capital Territory
- In office 17 December 2008 – 17 March 2010
- President: Umaru Musa Yar'Adua
- Preceded by: Aliyu Modibbo Umar
- Succeeded by: Bala Muhammed

Governor of Kebbi State
- In office 29 May 1999 – 29 May 2007
- Deputy: Abdullahi Abubakar Babaya; Sulaiman Muhammad Argungu
- Preceded by: Samaila Bature Chamah
- Succeeded by: Usman Saidu Nasamu Dakingari

Personal details
- Born: Muhammad Adamu Aliero; 1 January 1957 (age 69) Aliero, Northern Region, British Nigeria (now in Kebbi State, Nigeria)
- Party: Peoples Democratic Party (2007–2011; 2012–2014; 2022–2025) APC(2025—Present).
- Other political affiliations: United Nigeria Congress Party (1997–1998); All Nigeria Peoples Party (1998–2007); Congress for Progressive Change (2011–2012); All Progressives Congress (2014–2022)
- Spouses: Maimuna Aliero; Zainab Aliero; Aaliyah Aliero
- Children: 11
- Education: Ahmadu Bello University
- Occupation: Politician

Muhammad Adamu Aliero (born 1 January 1957) is a Nigerian politician who is the senator representing Kebbi Central senatorial district since 2015. He previously served in that position from 2007 to 2008. He served as the governor of Kebbi State from 1999 to 2007. He is a member of the All progressives Congress.

Aliero was appointed minister of the Federal Capital Territory by President Umaru Musa Yar'Adua in December 2008. He left office in March 2010 when Acting President Goodluck Jonathan dissolved his cabinet.

== Early life and education ==
Born in Aliero, Aliero Local Government Area of Kebbi State (then part of the Northern Region), Adamu received his primary education at an Islamic school. His elementary education commenced in 1965 at Aliero Town Planning School. He then attended the Government Secondary School in Koko and graduated in 1976.

This was followed by admission into the School of Basic Studies at Ahmadu Bello University, where he enrolled in the Interim Joint Matriculation Board (IJMB) certificate program. He began his undergraduate studies in 1977 and graduated with a Bachelor of Science degree in political science in 1980.

== Early career ==
In 1981, Aliero began his working career as an administrative officer at the College of Education in Sokoto and joined the Nigeria Immigration Service in the same year. In 1997, he voluntarily resigned from the Customs and Excise Service and went into the private business sector, dealing in export and import trade.

== Political career ==
His political career began in 1998 when, running on the platform of the now defunct United Nigeria Congress Party (UNCP), he contested and won a Senate seat representing the Kebbi Central constituency. The results of the election annulled soon after they were announced. Following the death of military dictator General Sani Abacha and a brief period of transition, new elections were held. Aliero, now representing the All People's Party (APP), contested and won the Kebbi State gubernatorial election. He was sworn in on 29 May 1999.

Aliero was re-elected in 2003 for a second four-year term and was one of only four incumbent ANPP (the APP was later renamed All Nigeria People's Party due to a factional split) governors to maintain their positions.

Aliero left the ANPP and joined the Peoples Democratic Party (PDP) in February 2007. He contested the April 2007 general elections for the Senate and won under the banner of the PDP. He is currently the member representing Kebbi Central Senatorial District in the Senate of the Federal Republic of Nigeria.

He has been switching from one party to the other. For example, he re-decamped to PDP after spending about a year in CPC in early 2012. He later moved from PDP to APC in 2014. He and his some of his close associates since 1999, like Sani Zauro, who was also former state chairman of defunct Congress for Progressive Change (CPC) board of trustees (BoT) in Kebbi State also quit PDP for APC.

He was named the chairman, Senate committee on land transport of the 10th senate on 8 August 2023.

== Corruption Allegations and Misconduct ==
On 21st June 2009 The Conference of Nigeria Political Parties (CNPP) ask Adamu Aliero to resign over the corruption charges against him, the allegations of over 10 billion naira during his tenure as governor of Kebbi State.

On 31st July, 2008 Justice Adamu Bello summoned the two anti- graft agencies EFCC and ICPC for not investigating Adamu Aliero over alleged 10.2 billion naira fraud in Kebbi State.

== Personal life ==
Aliero has three wives and is a father of 10 children. He is currently living in Abuja.

== See also ==
- List of governors of Kebbi State
