= Shanga, Nigeria =

Shanga
- LGA and town
- Interactive map of Shanga
- Location within Nigeria
- Coordinates: 11°11′45″N 4°34′3″E
- Country: Nigeria
- State: Kebbi State

Area
  - Total: 1,642 km^{2} (634 sq mi)

Population (2006)
  - Total: 127,146
  - Density: 77.43/km^{2} (200.6/sq mi)
- Time zone: UTC+1 (WAT)
- Postal code: 870

Shanga is a town and Local Government Area in Kebbi State, Nigeria.

It has an area of 1,642 km^{2} and had a population of 127,146 at the 2006 census.

The postal code of the area is 870.

== Climate ==
The temperature in the wet season is hot, oppressive, and overcast, while in the dry season it's sweltering and partly cloudy.

Shanga's temperature is rising and falling due to climate change, with warming stripes denoting average temperatures.
