= Koko/Besse =

- LGA
- Interactive map of Koko/Besse
- Country: Nigeria
- State: Kebbi State
- Headquarter: Besse Town

Government
  - Local Government Chairman: Siraju Usman Koko

Area
  - Total: 1,299 km^{2} (502 sq mi)

Population (2006)
  - Total: 154,605
  - Density: 119.0/km^{2} (308.3/sq mi)
- Time zone: UTC+1 (WAT)
- Postal code: 871

Koko/Besse is a Local Government Area in Kebbi State, Nigeria. Its headquarters is in Besse Town. Koko/Besse Local Government Area, located in Kebbi State, Nigeria, was created in 1991 and headquartered in Besse. The area was carved out of the former Bagudo Local Government, with its name representing a combination of the two prominent towns, Koko and Besse. The region is largely inhabited by the Hausawa, Fulani Zabarmawa and Gimbanawa

It has an area of 1,299 km^{2} and a population of 154,605 at the 2006 census.

The postal code of the area is 871.

== Climate ==
Koko/Besse experiences a warm tropical climate with moderate seasonal rainfall between June and September. Its long dry season is typically hot and occasionally affected by Harmattan dust flows.
