= Suru, Nigeria =

Suru
- LGA and town
- Interactive map of Suru
- Country: Nigeria
- State: Kebbi State
- Headquarter: Dakingari

Government
  - Local Government Chairman: Muhammad Lawal

Area
  - Total: 1,352 km^{2} (522 sq mi)

Population (2006)
  - Total: 150,230
  - Density: 111.1/km^{2} (287.8/sq mi)
- Time zone: UTC+1 (WAT)
- Postal code: 862

Suru is a town and Local Government Area in Kebbi State, Nigeria. Its headquarters is in the town of Dakingari. Suru was created in 1991 out of Bunza LGA, which lies to the north and east. The major ethnic groups include Fulani, Hausa and Zarma with scattered small villages around the LGA.

It has an area of 1,352 km^{2} and a population of 150,230 at the 2006 census.

The postal code of the area is 862.

== Climate ==
The yearly temperature in Suru, a district with a tropical wet and dry savanna climate, is 33.59 °C, 4.13% higher than Nigeria's averages.
