= Bagudo =

- LGA and town
- Interactive map of Bagudo
- Country: Nigeria
- State: Kebbi State

Government
  - Local Government Chairman: Aliyu Sabo Zaga

Area
  - Total: 7,782 km^{2} (3,005 sq mi)

Population (2006)
  - Total: 865,817
- Time zone: UTC+1 (WAT)
- Postal code: 871

Bagudo is a town and Local Government Area in Kebbi State, Nigeria, sharing a boundary with the Republic of Niger and Republic of Benin.

It has an area of 7,782 km^{2} and a population of 865,817 at the 2006 census.

The postal code of the area is 871.

Bagudo as how the name implies was founded by a Fulani Cattle Rearer called Wabudo, the town has a good settled population which are mainly Fula, Hausas and Zabarmawa with a little Yoruba population and the mainly spoken languages are Hausa and Fula. Islam arrived the city in the 16 century or earlier primarily through the trans-Saharan trade and as a result became wealthy and the commercial nerve centre of the region and is still associated as the "centre of Farming, Herdsmen and Many more.

== Geography, Temperature, Climate ==
The geography of Bagudo LGA encompasses a total expanse of 7,782 square kilometres (3,005 square miles) and encompasses two distinct seasons; the dry and rainy seasons. Notably, the Niger River traverses through this region, contributing to a humidity level of approximately 12%, while the average temperature is 32 °C or 89.6 °F.

The temperature in the wet season is hot, oppressive, and overcast, while in the dry season it's sweltering and partly cloudy.

Climate change is raising temperatures in Bagudo, affecting air quality, melting glaciers, rising sea levels, desertification, and the frequency of extreme weather events.

== Economy ==
Fishing emerges as a vital component, coexisting with the predominant practice of agriculture, where various crops are cultivated in substantial quantities. Additionally, trade thrives within Bagudo Local Government Area, featuring several markets, including the bustling Lolo central market, offering a diverse array of commodities for prospective buyers.
