= Birnin Kebbi =

Capital city of Kebbi State, Nigeria

- LGA and town
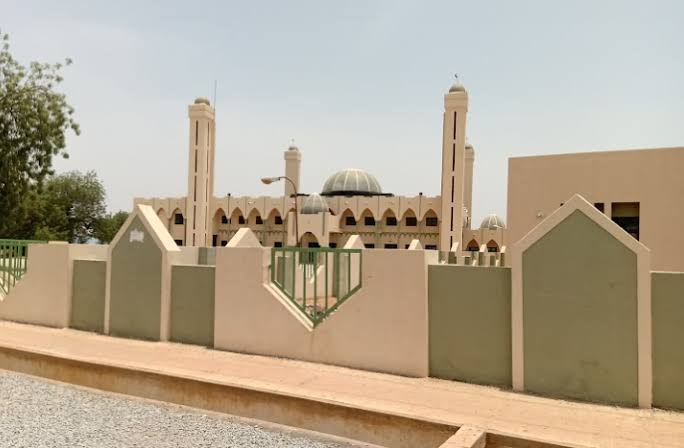
- Central masjid of Birnin Kebbi
- Interactive map of Birnin Kebbi
- Location within Nigeria
- Coordinates: 12°27′13″N 4°12′01″E
- Country: Nigeria
- State: Kebbi State

Government

Area
  - Total: 1,037 km^{2} (400 sq mi)

Population (2022)
  - Total: 458,900
  - Density: 442.5/km^{2} (1,146/sq mi)
- Time zone: UTC+1 (WAT)
- Area code: 860101
- Climate: BSh

Birnin Kebbi is a city located in northwestern Nigeria It is the capital city of Kebbi State and headquarters of the Gwandu Emirate. As at 2007 the city had an estimated population of 125,594 people. Kebbi is mostly a Hausa and Fulani state, with Islam as the major religion. Formerly it was the capital of the Kebbi Emirate, which relocated to Argungu after the conquest by Gwandu in 1831. The town remained the capital of Kebbi until 1805, when it was burned in the Fulani jihad (“holy war”) by Abdullahi dan Fodio, a brother of the jihad leader and later Emir of Gwandu. After Birnin Kebbi was incorporated into the Fulani Emirate of Gwandu, it was eclipsed in political importance by Gwandu (Gando) town, 30 miles (48 km) east, and as a caravan and riverside market centre by Jega, 20 miles (32 km) southeast, which lay at the head of navigation on the Zamfara River, a tributary of the Sokoto. Ironically, while Argungu (48 km or 30 miles northeast) became the traditional seat of the king of Kebbi in 1827, Birnin Kebbi served as the Gwandu emirate headquarters after Emir Haliru was inaugurated there in 1906. Birnin Kebbi became the capital of the newly created Nigerian state of Kebbi in 1991.

Although Birnin Kebbi has declined as a river port because of silting as well as political conditions, it now serves as a collecting point for peanuts (groundnuts) and rice and as a major local market centre in millet, sorghum, rice, fish, goats, and cattle. It is the site of a state polytechnic college and a government rice-research station. Its Hausa and Fulani inhabitants are Muslims. Birnin Kebbi is also a Local government area with a population of 366,200 (2016 est.).

== Healthcare ==
Birnin Kebbi has many hospitals and medical facilities, some of which were established since before the Nigerian Independence. For example, the oldest hospital in Birnin Kebbi is found to be Sir Yahaya Memorial Hospital. Federal Medical Center can also be found in Birnin Kebbi metropolis.

Other private healthcare include:

- Godiya Hospital Birnin Kebbi
- Salima Private Clinic
- Medicaid Cancer Foundation

== Transportation ==
The city is served by the Sir Ahmadu Bello International Airport.

== Geography and Climate ==
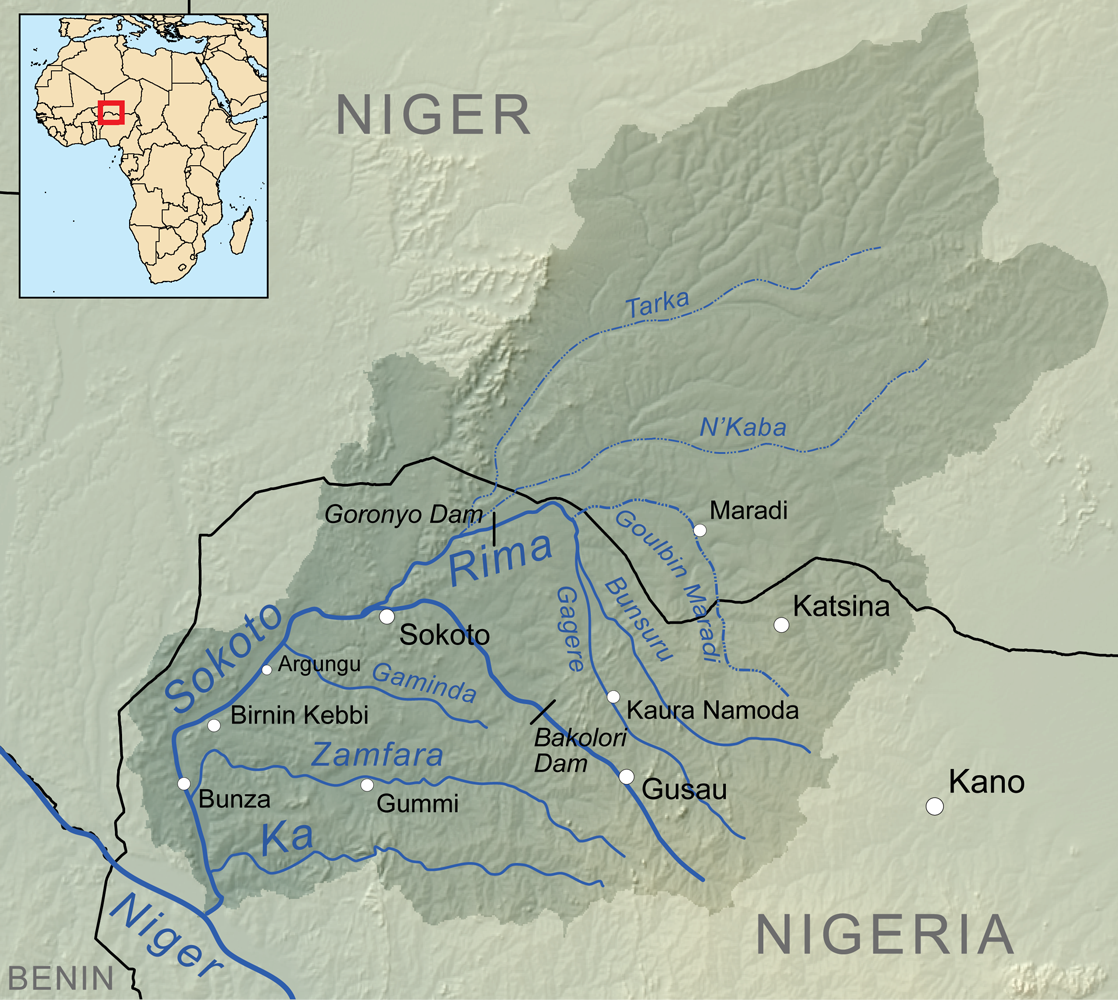
Sokoto river basin

Birnin Kebbi is located on the Sokoto River and is connected by road to Argungu (45 km northeast), Jega (35 km southeast), and Bunza (45 km southwest) and the city is dominated by the Fulani ethnic group

=== Environment and Normal Climate All year in Birnin Kebbi Nigeria ===
In Birnin Kebbi, the wet season is hot, harsh, and for the most part shady and the dry season is boiling and part of the way overcast. Throughout the span of the year, the temperature regularly changes from 65 °F to 104 °F and is seldom underneath 61 °F or above 108 °F

=== Normal Temperature in Birnin Kebbi ===
The hot season goes on for 2.1 months, from March 11 to May 16, with a typical everyday high temperature above 101 °F. The most sizzling month of the year in Birnin Kebbi is April, with a typical high of 104 °F and low of 81 °F.

The cool season goes on for 2.3 months, from July 7 to September 18, with a typical day to day high temperature underneath 91 °F. The coldest month of the year in Birnin Kebbi is January, with a typical low of 66 °F and high of 90 °F.

=== Effect of Climate change and variability ===
This have had an impact, and numerous geophysical analyzers have looked into this. Most past inquiry concerning long cart climatologic models have zeroed in on surface air temperature and rainstorm. Past examinations have revealed concussion of environmental change on water quality factors; on stream; on the weather; furthermore, on pond levels (Partal and Kahya, 2005). From these and different investigations, a range of expected climatic effects on the hydrologic system for different geographic part can be guessed. (Burn and Hag Elnur (2002)) examined the connections that exist between meteorological variables and hydrologic variables. At special locations, resemblance in the trends and hydrologic patterns of two distinct variables were genuine in the article. They used just the Mann-Kendall test to recognize patterns for 18 hydrologic factors. Most past investigations have used Kendall's test to distinguish hydroclimatologic patterns and conceivable climatic varieties. Partal and Kahya (2005 descriptive two classes of strategies exhaustively:

(i) intrablock methods (procedures that first remove the block achieve from each datum, then sum the data over blocks, and finally produce a statistic from these sums) and (ii) coordinated ranks methods (methods that compute a statistic, such as Kendall's, for each block or season and then sum these to produce a single overall statistic).

Abaje et al. (2010) expressed that perhaps of the main climatic variety in the African Sahel since the last part of the 1960s has been the persevering decrease in precipitation. The Sahel is described areas of strength for by varieties and a sporadic precipitation that reaches somewhere in the range of 200 mm (7.9 in) and 600 mm with coefficients of variety going from 15 to 30%. It was reported that 29-49% less rain fell.

== Pollution ==
Reported by Premium times ng, flood had rendered many people living around the Bernin Kebbi homeless, it destroyed their farm produce and other property and contaminated potable water sources.

According to the Community Health in the state Ministry of Health, Muhammad-Abdullahi Bubuce, He stated that that 328 people were affected in Birnin Kebbi when this incident took place. Based on his report, the ministry took measures to arrest the situation, in order to solve more spread of the disease.
