= Arewa Dandi =

- LGA and town
- Interactive map of Arewa Dandi
- Coordinates: 12°42′N 4°06′E
- Country: Nigeria
- State: Kebbi State

Government
  - Local Government Chairman: Mansur Isa

Area
  - Total: 3,901 km^{2} (1,506 sq mi)

Population (2006)
  - Total: 184,030
  - Density: 47.18/km^{2} (122.2/sq mi)
- Time zone: UTC+1 (WAT)
- Postal code: 861

Arewa Dandi is a town and Local Government Area in Kebbi State, Nigeria, sharing a boundary with the Republic of Niger.

It has an area of 3,901 km^{2} and a population of 184,030 at the 2006 census.

The postal code of the area is 861.

== Geography, Climate, Temperature ==
Arewa Dadin Local Government Area (LGA) encompasses a total expanse of 3,901 square kilometers or 1,506 square miles and experiences two well-defined seasons: the rainy season and the dry season. The dry season, in particular, is marked by scorching temperatures, with an average temperature of approximately 34 degrees Celsius or 93 degrees Fahrenheit. The area maintains an average humidity level of around 24 percent. Its terrain is predominantly composed of dry and arid plains, accentuated by scattered hills and other elevated features.

Arewa Dandi has a semi-arid Sudan–Sahel climate with hot temperatures and low annual rainfall. The rainy season occurs from June to September, while the rest of the year is dominated by dry Harmattan winds, which reduce humidity and visibility.

== Economy ==
Agriculture stands as the predominant economic activity in Arewa Dadin Local Government Area, with a reputation for cultivating various crops, including grains and onions. Cattle rearing also holds a prominent place in the local economy, particularly among the Fulani community residing in the area.

== Localities ==
Towns and Villages in Arewa Local Government Area.

- Amagwato
- Baraje Buii
- Bachaka
- Chibike
- Danstohuwa
- Daura
- Dantsoho
- Falde
- Fasko
- Feske
- Jantullu
- Kangiwa
- Muza Jaffeji
- Rafin Taska
- Jantullu
- Jarkuka
- Laima
- Sakwaba
- Sarka
- Yeldu
- Gorun Dikko
- Gumundai
- Gunki
