= Kalgo =

- LGA and town
- Interactive map of Kalgo
- Country: Nigeria
- State: Kebbi State
- Established: 1996

Government
  - Type: local
  - Local Government Chairman: Yahaya Bala Kuka

Area
  - Total: 1,173 km^{2} (453 sq mi)

Population (2006)
  - Total: 85,403
  - Density: 72.81/km^{2} (188.6/sq mi)
- Time zone: UTC+1 (WAT)
- Postal code: 862

Kalgo is a town and Local Government Area (LGA) in Kebbi State, Nigeria. It was created in 1996 out of the Bunza LGA.

It has an area of 1,173 km^{2} and a population of 85,403 at the 2006 census.

The postal code of the area is 862.

== Climate ==
The temperature in the wet season is hot, oppressive, and mostly cloudy, while in the dry season it's sweltering and partly cloudy.

Kalgo has a hot Sudan–Sahel climate characterized by a short rainy season from June to September. The dry season is long and marked by persistent heat and the influence of Harmattan winds.
