= Bunza =

Coordinates: 12.0916°N 4.0108°E

Bunza Kitari
- LGA and town
- Interactive map of Bunza
- Country: Nigeria
- State: Kebbi State
- Established: 1975

Government
  - Chairman: Zaiyanu Shehu

Area
  - Total: 876 km^{2} (338 sq mi)

Population (2006)
  - Total: 121,461
  - Density: 139/km^{2} (359/sq mi)
- Time zone: UTC+1 (WAT)
- Postal code: 862

Bunza is a town and Local Government Area (LGA) in Kebbi State, Nigeria. It was created in 1975 out of the then-state of Sokoto during the local government reform under the General Murtala administration. Bunza shares bounders in the east with Kalgo LGA, the latter was created in 1996 out of the present Bunza; in the north with Dandi and Arewa LGA's; and in the south and west with Suru Local Government Area, the latter was created in 1991 out of Bunza.

It has an area of 876 square kilometers and a 2006 population of 121,461 at the census.

The postal code of the area is 862.

== Climate and Geography ==
Bunza local government area spans an entire expanse of 876 square kilometers or 338 square miles and experiences two significant seasons, the dry season and the rainy season. The average temperature in Bunza registers at 33 °C (91 °F), while the area's humidity level is estimated to be around 17 percent.

With an average yearly temperature of 31.37 °C (88.47 °F), the district of Bunza has a tropical wet and dry climate, which is 1.91% warmer than the national average for Nigeria.

Temperature fluctuations and a growing average temperature point to a favourable trend in Bunza's direction.

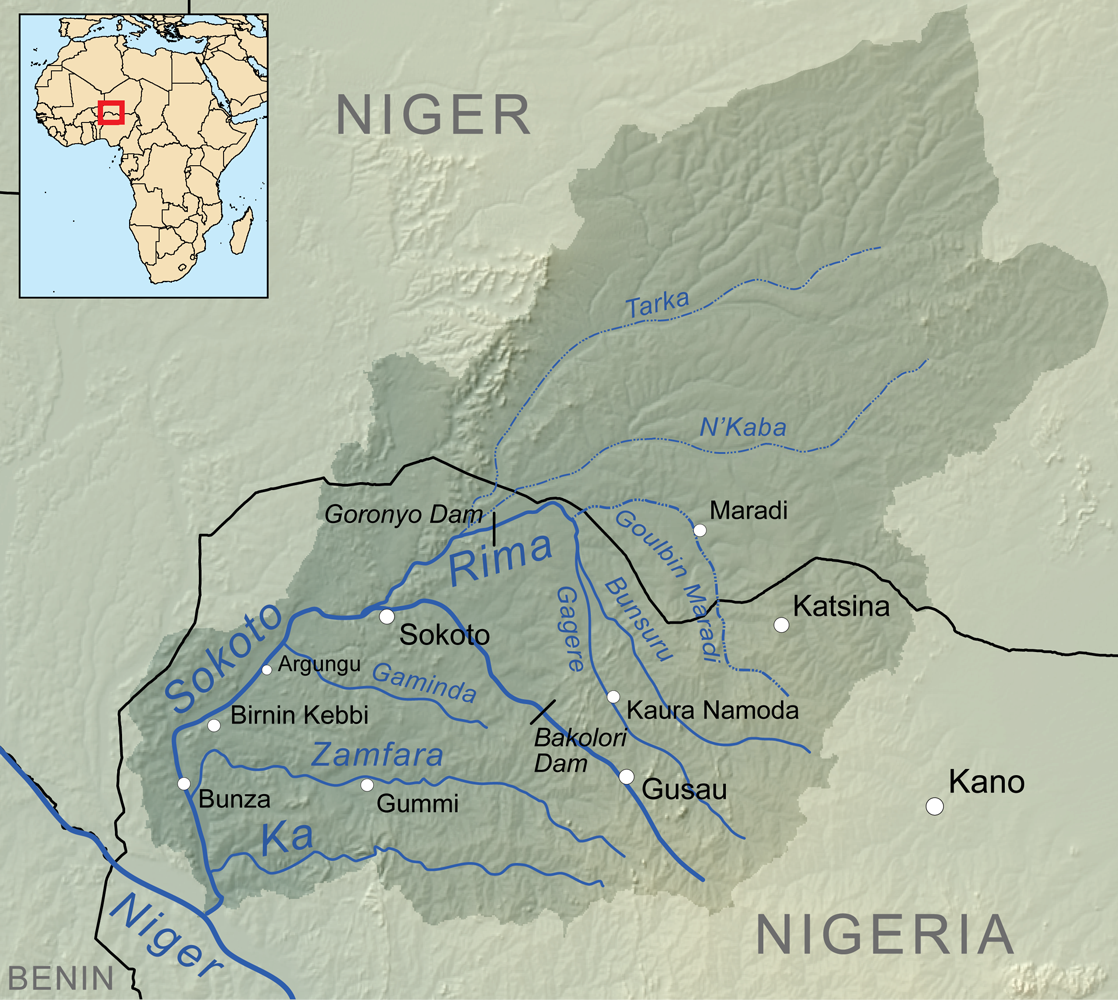
Sokoto river basin

== Economy ==
In Bunza local government area, a variety of crops are grown, which encompass groundnuts, rice, millet, sorghum, and onions. Additionally, key economic engagements in Bunza involve hunting, trade, and metalwork.
