= 1979 Bauchi State gubernatorial election =

1979 gubernatorial election in Bauchi State, Nigeria

- July 28, 1979
Nominee	Tatari Ali
Party	NPN
Governor before election
Garba Duba
Nigerian military junta
Elected Governor
Tatari Ali
NPN

The 1979 Bauchi State gubernatorial election occurred on July 28, 1979. NPN's Abubakar Tatari Ali won election for a first term to become Bauchi State's first executive governor leading and, defeating main opposition in the contest.

== Electoral system ==
The Governor of Bauchi State is elected using the plurality voting system.

== Results ==
There were five political parties registered by the Federal Electoral Commission (FEDECO) to participate in the election. Tatari Ali of the NPN won the contest by polling the highest votes.

Candidate	Party
Tatari Ali	National Party of Nigeria (NPN)
Great Nigeria People's Party (GNPP)	
Total
Source: Africa Spectrum
