= 1979 Sokoto State gubernatorial election =

1979 gubernatorial election in Sokoto State, Nigeria

- July 28, 1979
Nominee	Shehu Kangiwa
Party	NPN
Running mate	Garba Nadama
Elected Governor
Shehu Kangiwa
NPN

The 1979 Sokoto State gubernatorial election occurred on July 28, 1979. NPN candidate Shehu Kangiwa won the election.

Shehu Kangiwa became the gubernatorial candidate of NPN on June 25, 1979.

== Results ==
Abubakar Rimi representing PRP won the election. The election held on July 28, 1979.
