= Bamigboye =

Bámigboyè
- Gender: Male
- Language: Yoruba

Origin
- Origin: Nigerian
- Meaning: Help me receive honour
- Region of origin: South West, Nigeria

Bámigboyè is a Nigerian surname of Yoruba origin, typically bestowed upon males. It means "Help me receive honour.". Bámigboyè is a powerful name with depth and profound meaning. The diminutive forms include Bámgboyè and/or Bángboyè same meaning but in shorter form with Yoruba phonetic reduction.

== Notable individuals with the name ==
- Baz Bamigboye (born 1957), British gossip columnist.
- David Bamigboye (1940–2018), Nigerian military commander and politician.
- Theophilus Bamigboye (born 1951), Nigerian Colonel.
- Azeez Omogbolahan Bamigboye (Born 1999), Youth Leader and Advocate, Social entrepreneur.
