= 1991 Bauchi State gubernatorial election =

1991 gubernatorial election in Bauchi State, Nigeria

Bauchi gubernatorial election
- December 14, 1991
Nominee	Dahiru Mohammed
Party	NRC
Elected Governor
Dahiru Mohammed
NRC

The 1991 Bauchi State gubernatorial election occurred on December 14, 1991. NRC candidate Dahiru Mohammed won the election.

== Conduct ==
The gubernatorial election was conducted using an open ballot system. Primaries for the two parties to select their flag bearers were conducted on October 19, 1991.

The election occurred on December 14, 1991. NRC candidate Dahiru Mohammed won the election.
