= 1999 Bauchi State gubernatorial election =

1999 gubernatorial election in Bauchi State, Nigeria

- January 9, 1999
Nominee	Adamu Mu'azu
Party	PDP	All People's Party (Nigeria)
Running mate	Abdulmalik Mohammed
Popular vote	503,447	386,174
Percentage	56%
Governor before election
Abdul Mshelia
Nigerian military junta
Elected Governor
Adamu Mu'azu
PDP

The 1999 Bauchi State gubernatorial election occurred in Nigeria on January 9, 1999. The PDP nominee, Adamu Mu'azu, polled 56% of total vote to win the election, defeating the APP candidate and others.

Adamu Mu'azu defeated Alhaji Tafawa Balewa at the PDP primary election to become the party's candidate. His running mate was Abdulmalik Mohammed.

== Electoral system ==
The Governor of Bauchi State is elected using the plurality voting system.

== Results ==
PDP's Adamu Mu'azu emerged winner in the contest.

The total number of registered voters in the state for the election was 1,941,913. However, 1,997,000 were previously issued voting cards in the state.

Candidate	Party	Votes	%
Adamu Mu'azu	People's Democratic Party (PDP)	503,447	55.64
All People's Party (APP)	386,174	42.68	
Alliance for Democracy (AD)	15,168	1.68	
Total		904,789	100.00
Registered voters/turnout		1,941,913	–
Source: Nigeria World, IFES
