= 1983 Sokoto State gubernatorial election =

1983 gubernatorial election in Sokoto State, Nigeria

- August 13, 1983
Nominee	Garba Nadama
Party	NPN
Running mate	Muhammed Bacaka
Governor before election
Shehu Kangiwa
NPN
Elected Governor
Garba Nadama
NPN

The 1983 Sokoto State gubernatorial election occurred on August 13, 1983. NPN candidate Garba Nadama won the election.

== Results ==
Garba Nadama representing NPN won the election. The election held on August 13, 1983.
