= Okuama killings =

The Okuama killings (also referred to as the Okuama tragedy, the Okuama massacre, or the Okuama attack) refers to the ambush and killing of Nigerian Army personnel on 14 March 2024 in Okuama, a community in Ughelli South Local Government Area of Delta State, Nigeria, and the subsequent military operation in and around the community.

The Nigerian Defence Headquarters said a lieutenant colonel, two majors, a captain and thirteen soldiers of the 181 Amphibious Battalion were killed, along with a civilian hostage that the soldiers were deployed to rescue. In the weeks that followed, the army carried out an extended search operation in Okuama where homes in the community were burned, demolished, and thousands of residents were displaced. The troops did not withdraw until May 2024. A related military operation was also carried out in Igbomotoru, a community in Bayelsa State, in the search for a suspect linked to the killings.

The National Assembly opened investigations and the Defence Headquarters convened a Board of Inquiry. Several Okuama community leaders were detained by the military without charge from August 2024; two later died in custody, and, as of April 2026, others remained held without trial.

== Background ==
Okuama, part of the Ewu-Urhobo Kingdom in Ughelli South Local Government Area, and Okoloba, in neighbouring Bomadi Local Government Area, are riverine communities in Delta State whose residents share close social ties, including intermarriage, but have long disputed ownership of farmland and fishing waters between them. The Delta State government held meetings with representatives of both communities in February 2024 in an attempt to resolve the dispute.

The dispute escalated on 27 January 2024, when youths from Okoloba allegedly ambushed and killed three men from Okuama and concealed the bodies. In retaliation, youths from Okuama abducted an Okoloba indigene, Anthony Aboh, on 13 March 2024. The Okoloba community alerted the police and the military Joint Task Force (JTF) Bomadi Division, and troops of the 181 Amphibious Battalion, based in Bomadi, were deployed to Okuama to mediate the dispute and secure the hostage's release.

== Killing of the soldiers ==
On 14 March 2024, a military team led by the battalion's commanding officer, Lieutenant Colonel Abdullahi Hassan Ali, went to Okuama to negotiate Aboh's release. According to military and community accounts, discussions broke down, and as the soldiers made their way back to their boats they were surrounded and attacked to death by armed youths at the community waterfront. No group has publicly claimed responsibility for the attack. The army attributed it to youths from Okuama, an allegation the community's leadership has disputed.

Bodies of 14 to 16 military personnel were recovered from Forçados River and its creeks. The Defence Headquarters subsequently confirmed that 17 military personnel were dead including the battalion's commanding officer, two majors, a captain and thirteen soldiers along with Anthony Aboh, the civilian hostage whose body was also recovered. Journalists who reported on the recovery operation described a number of the bodies as mutilated, including several that had been beheaded. The remains of the seventeen soldiers and officers were buried at National Military Cemetery, Abuja on 27 March 2024.

== Military operation and reprisal allegations ==
Within a day of the killings, houses in Okuama were reported to be on fire, and the army moved additional troops and armoured vehicles into the area. The military initially denied carrying out reprisals, describing reports of burning as propaganda, while acknowledging that around 20 suspects had been arrested by 18 March 2024. Over the following weeks, further reports from residents and journalists described additional houses being razed or demolished as troops maintained a presence in the community. Bayelsa State authorities had put the toll from the Igbomotoru operation at around 20 deaths and a number of destroyed houses.

The Nigerian Army maintained a presence in Okuama until Delta State Governor Sheriff Oborevwori announced on 8 May 2024 that troops had withdrawn, following discussions with the then Chief of Army Staff, Lieutenant General Taoreed Lagbaja.

Between 18 and 20 August 2024, the military arrested a number of Okuama community leaders in connection with the killings, including Professor Arthur Ekpekpo, a physicist at Delta State University and president-general of the Ewu-Urhobo Kingdom/Okuama community union; the community's treasurer, Pa Dennis Okugbaye; its president-general, Pa James Oghoroko; and several others, among them Chief Belvis Adogbo, Pa Anthony Ahwemuria and Mrs Mabel Owhemu. The traditional ruler of Ewu-Urhobo Kingdom, HRM Clement Ikolo, was also detained for a period after voluntarily presenting himself to a military facility in Asaba.

Pa James Oghoroko died in military custody on 4 December 2024, days before a scheduled bail hearing. Pa Dennis Okugbaye, aged 81, died on 10 December 2024 while being transported by the military for medical treatment, shortly after being released on bail.

== Reactions ==
The National Human Rights Commission condemned the killing of both the soldiers and civilians as a violation of the right to life, while also rejecting the practice of individuals or groups taking the law into their own hands. The Ijaw Youth Council described the killing of the soldiers as unacceptable and called for the perpetrators to be brought to justice. Urhobo groups and traditional rulers later pressed the state government to accelerate the resettlement and rebuilding of Okuama.

Femi Falana compared it to the Odi massacre, Bayelsa in 1999 and Zaki Biam massacre, Benue State, in 2001.

== See also ==
- Odi massacre
- Zaki Biam massacre
