= Adabah Christian =

Nigerian politician

Member of the House of Representatives
- In office 2015–2019
- Constituency: Ado/Ogbadibo/Okpokwu

Personal details
- Born: December 1965 (age 60) Otukpa, Ogbadibo, Benue State, Nigeria
- Party: Peoples Democratic Party
- Occupation: Politician

Adabah Christian is a Nigerian politician and lawmaker from Otukpa town in Ogbadibo Local Government Area of Benue State, Nigeria. He was born in December 1965.

== Career and political life ==
In 2015, Adabah Christian contested for the office of the House of Representatives, representing the Ado/Ogbadibo/Opkokwu constituency under the Peoples Democratic Party (PDP) and won. His tenure lasted from 2015 to 2019. This was the first time the PDP won in the constituency. His victory followed an appeal court ruling in his favor against Rep Hassan Saleh.
