= 1983 Bauchi State gubernatorial election =

1983 gubernatorial election in Bauchi State, Nigeria

- August 13, 1983
Nominee	Tatari Ali
Party	NPN
Governor before election
Tatari Ali
NPN
Elected Governor
Tatari Ali
NPN

The 1983 Bauchi State gubernatorial election occurred in Nigeria on August 13, 1983. The NPN nominee Tatari Ali won the election, defeating other candidates.

Tatari Ali emerged NPN candidate.

== Electoral system ==
The Governor of Bauchi State is elected using the plurality voting system.

== Primary election ==
=== NPN primary ===
The NPN primary election was won by Tatari Ali.

== Results ==
Candidate	Party
Tatari Ali	National Party of Nigeria
Total
Source: World States Men
