= Bassa Nge people =

Ethnic group in Nigeria

The Bassa Nge are an ethnic group in Nigeria that traces its history back to 1805. They originally inhabited Gbara which was formerly the capital of the Nupe Kingdom. The Bassa Nge migrated from their homeland in Bida due to a dynastic feud in about 1820. They are formerly the largest of Nupe groups, with a population of about 15,000 in 1820 before they dispersed throughout Nigeria.

They speak two languages: The Nupe-Tako dialect of the Nupe language of the Volta-Niger languages and the Bassa Nge or Bassa Nupe (all of the Niger-Congo and Benue-Congo group of West African languages).

In 2017, Bassa Nge Community North America (BNC) held an annual convention in Philadelphia which discussed progress of the community with more than 54 members and guests attending the convention. Their history came on when the BNC made a donations of over the counter (OTC) medicines in their headquarters clinic in Gboloko.

In an interview with Ma’ade Yaila, a Bassa-Nge daughter stated that her language has its roots from Nupe.

They belongs to the Benue-Congo branch of the Niger-Congo family, the Bassa Nge traditional ruler is called Etsu unlike the Etsu Nupe called in Nupe too, the language is not similar to the one Bassa Nkomo which they lived in the same geographical place. The Bassa-nge can be found in Niger river and conflict of river Benue, they lived in Bassa local government and majority in Lokoja.

The present Etsu of Bassa-nge in Bassa is Brig. Abu Ali. One among the children of the incumbent Etsu Bassa-Nge Col. Muhammad Abu Ali, was the one that lead the 221 battalion tank to fight against Boko Haram in Borno and died in 2016 together with five soldiers, the Kogi State Governor, Yahaya Bello condoled the family of Etsu of Bassa-Nge Kingdom Brig Gen. Abu Ali (Rtd) over the death of Col. Muhammed Abu Ali his first son.

The history of BassaNge is available in Stanford University libraries.

The Bassa-Nge People have their traditional ruler at Gboloko and the traditional ruler title is called "Etsu Bassa-Nge". And the present Etsu of Bassa-Nge in Bassa is Rtd.Brig. Abu Alii.

== Bassa-Nge Culture ==
The recognised important religious beliefs and social traditional practices of the Bassa-Nge people includes the following:

=== Egbunu ===
This belief cut across most kim Bassa-nge but mainly practised in Kpata, Gboloko, Ecewu, Takete and Kpata-Kpale. The two types of Egbunu are Egbunu Aniso and Egbunu Acha. While the former comes out from time to time to fore warn against danger, expose and punish evil doers, the latter come out yearly during ceremonies or festivals with worshipers adorned with embellished attires and ornaments usually appearing from the forest. Both are led by a nomba with the backing of nna Egbunu (the spiritual mother of Egbunu).

=== Agana ===
This practise is exclusive to Ecewu, Egbo, and Eroko and Egeneja with similarities in all aspect to the Eriwota of Kpata.

=== Paradi ===
Para is an expensive but prestigious social ceremony carried out with beautifully selected women dressed in apparel such as beads, bangles, trinkets, necklaces and carrying costly and specially decorated load – carrying enamel dishes (agbogi) which are dressed up with velvetiness wrappers.

=== Angale and Badankolo ===
These are relatively recent existence in kim Bassa-Nge and seem to have originated from Nupe land. The musical instruments are drums of various sizes beaten by one man or a set of men. The music accompanying the instrument is usually melodious and danced gracefully by young girls and boys

=== Masquerades ===
Masquerades are cultural practices common to the Igalas but adopted by Bassa-Nge when they came in contact. A few examples of Bassa-Nge masquerades are eleibo, alage, eka, eri, ewuna, echeja of Egeneja etc.

=== Gombere ===
This appears originally to be identified with Christian social music and introduced to kim BassaNge in the later part of 1920’s, it started from Kpata and Ecewu communities and later spread through the land. It is a musical instrument consisting of various sizes of drums which is sat upon, a lead artist supply the music.

=== Dressing ===
While tracing the dressing culture of the Bassa Nge people, they were formerly one with Nupe, hence their dressings can be similar across different areas. Their cultural attire has blue, white and green colours.

Here are some photos of their cultural attire.

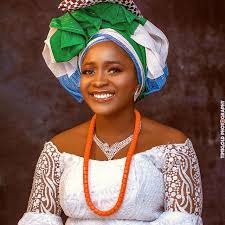

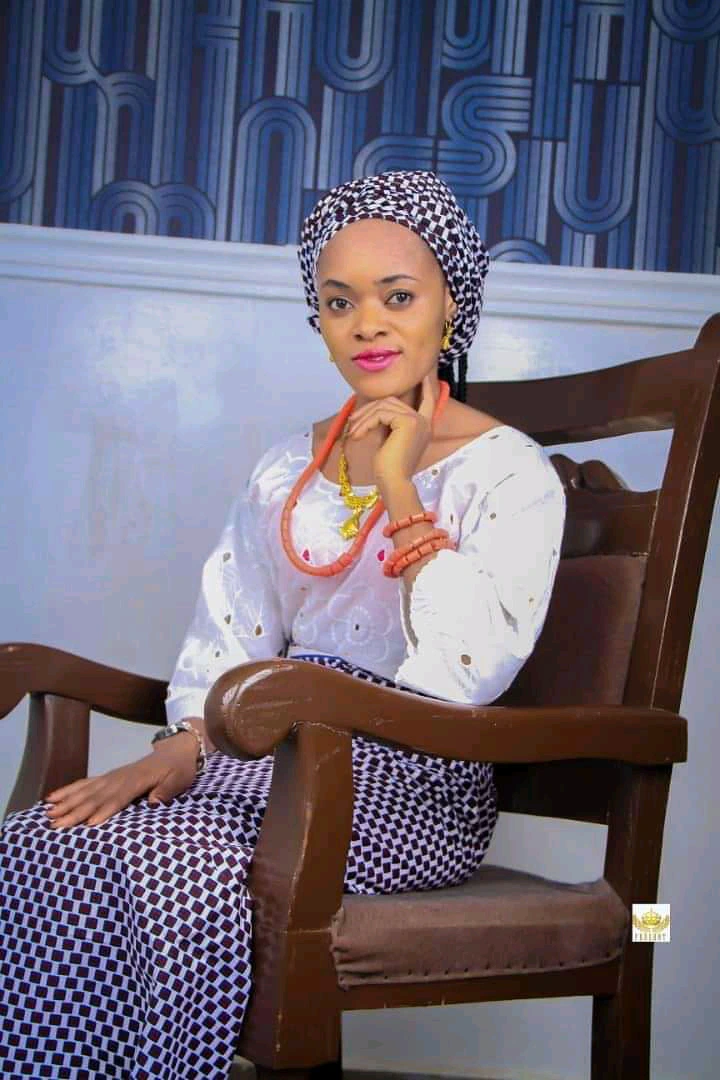

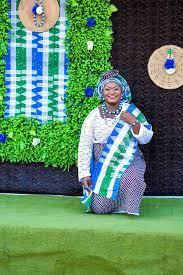
