= Mokwa General Hospital =

Geography
- Location: Mokwa, Niger State, Nigeria

Organisation
- Type: General hospital

Services
- Emergency department: Available

History
- Constructed: 1986

Links
- Lists: Hospitals in Nigeria

Mokwa General Hospital is a state government hospital located in Mokwa, the headquarters of Mokwa Local Government Area in Niger State, Nigeria.

== History ==
Mokwa General Hospital was established in the year 1986. The hospital is one of the biggest hospitals in Niger State.

The hospital was built by Senator David Mark when he was the military administrator of Niger State.
