= 1999 Kebbi State gubernatorial election =

1999 gubernatorial election in Kebbi State, Nigeria

- January 9, 1999
Nominee	Adamu Aliero	Mohammed Kaliel
Party	All People's Party (Nigeria)	PDP
Running mate	Abdullahi Abubakar Babaya	Sale Gambo
Popular vote	259,498	208,552
Governor before election
Abubakar Musa
NRC
Elected Governor
Adamu Aliero
All People's Party (Nigeria)

The 1999 Kebbi State gubernatorial election occurred on January 9, 1999. APP candidate Adamu Aliero won the election, defeating PDP candidate Mohammed Kaliel.

== Results ==
Adamu Aliero from the APP won the election. PDP candidate Mohammed Kaliel and AD candidate contested in the election.

The total number of registered voters in the state was 1,167,171, total votes cast was 500,938, valid votes was 472,062 and rejected votes was 28,876.

- Adamu Aliero, APP- 259,498
- Mohammed Kaliel, PDP- 208,552
- AD- 4,013
