= Gusau Dam =

Dam along Sokoto River

Coordinates: 12°08′41″N 6°40′15″E

- Interactive map of Gusau Dam
- Country: Nigeria

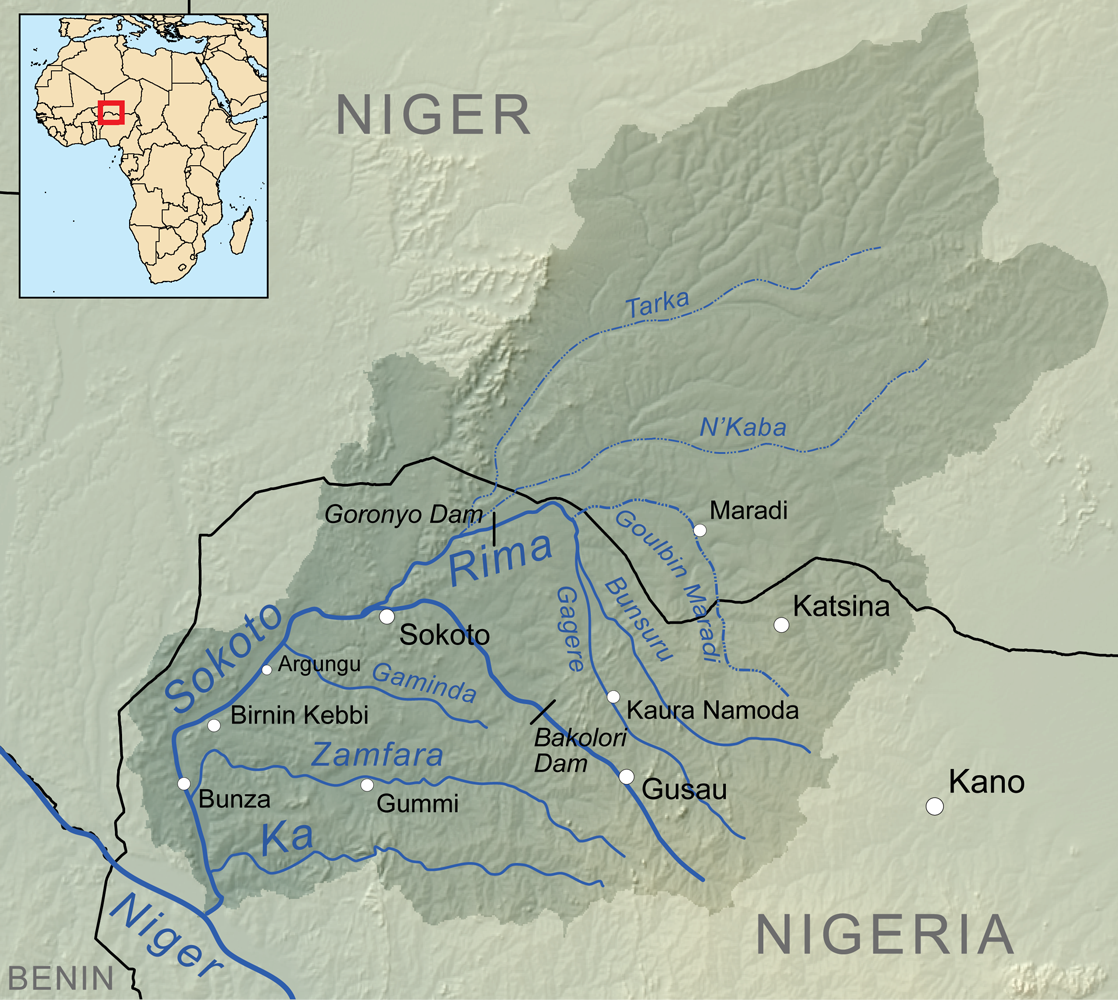
Sokoto river basin, Gusau to the southeast

The Gusau Dam holds a reservoir on the Sokoto River just upstream from Gusau, capital of Zamfara State in Nigeria. It supplies water to the city and neighboring communities. In 2006, the dam collapsed, killing 40 people and destroying 500 homes.

== Dam capacity ==
The dam was insufficient to meet local needs in times of drought. In January 2001, the Zamfara State Governor, Ahmed Sani Yerima met the federal minister of Water Resources, Mohammed Bello Kaliel and told him that Gusau Dam could dry up soon, asking the Federal Government to transfer water from the Bakolori Dam to Gusau. Kaliel said the Federal Government was committed to provide quality water to all Nigerians and would soon provide assistance to the states, with priority given to Gusau.

In June 2002, two groups in Zamfara State petitioned the Independent Corrupt Practices and Other Related Offences Commission (ICPC), alleging that Ahmed Sani Yerima had mismanaged and misappropriated Federal funds. The state government had made claims for improvement, dredging and repairs of a collapsed portion of the Gusau barrage at the cost of #14.2 million, resuscitation of the Barrage at #92million and de-siting of the Gusau Dam Barrage at #1.8 million. However, nothing appreciable had been done.

== 2006 collapse ==
A disaster occurred on Saturday, September 30, 2006, when the dam collapsed after heavy flooding. 40 people were killed and approximately 500 homes were destroyed, displacing 1,000 people. It occurred after the heaviest downpour ever recorded in the area, which had fallen for the previous two days. In addition to lost and damaged houses, large amounts of farmland that was almost due to be harvested was devastated and hundreds of livestock were killed. As well as the dam, a bridge linking the city to the northern part of Zamfara State was destroyed. Around 700 people were temporarily sheltered in a nearby secondary school in Birnin Ruwa area, where assistance was provided by the Red Cross. Drinking water wells were polluted by the floodwater. The accident occurred after sluice gates failed to function, causing the water to overwhelm the dam, says the operator, the Zamfara Water Board.

After the dam collapse, many residents had to resort to stream water. Water vendors more than doubled their price, selling a 25-litre Jerry can for N50 compared to N20 before.

== Later developments ==
In March 2007, the Federal government released #2.4 billion for the rehabilitation of the Gusau dam. In May 2007, the Zamfara state government said they were giving top priority to ensuring that water was retained in the dam, rehabilitating the water treatment plant, introducing modern equipment at the pumping stations, and developing the distribution network.

In January 2010, a Zamfara-based group called Concerned Citizens petitioned the Economic and Financial Crimes Commission (EFCC) to investigate the former Governor of Zamfara state, Ahmad Sani Yarima, for mismanagement of funds, including an N1 billion loan for Gusau dam repairs.
