= Basa language =

Basa language may refer to:

- Basa languages, several languages of Nigeria
- Basaa language, a Bantu language of Cameroon
- Bassa language, a Kru language of Liberia, Ivory Coast, and Sierra Leone
