= John Emaimo =

Nigerian academic

Rector of the Federal School of Dental Technology & Therapy
- Incumbent
- Assumed office Oct 2016

Personal details
- Born: 18 June 1966 (age 60) Nsit-Ubium, Akwa Ibom State, Nigeria
- Party: Non-Partisan

Prof. John Emaimo (born 18 June 1966) is currently serving his second term as the rector of Federal School of Dental Technology & Therapy, Enugu, Nigeria (the only college of its kind in Nigeria that trains dental technologists, dental therapists and dental nurses). His Excellency the President of the Federal Republic of Nigeria magnanimously approved the conversation of Federal School of Dental Technology & Therapy, Enugu to a university thereby giving the first training school for Dental Technologist and Therapist another nomenclature to Federal University of Allied Health and Science, Enugu which makes the rector Prof. John Emaimo the acting Vice Chancellor of the university until 25th March, 2025 when he was appointed as the substantive Vice Chancellor of the university making him to become the First Dental Technologist in Nigeria to become a Vice Chancellor in a Nigeria University.

== Education ==
John Emaimo had his secondary education at Comprehensive Secondary School, Nnung Obong, Akwa Ibom from 1979 to 1984, where he received the West African Examinations Council certificate in 1984. He then obtained a professional certificate in dental technology from the School of Medical Sciences, Ojo-Lagos (1987-1991, and a first degree in public administration from Ambrose Alli University). He currently holds two master's degrees, in social work and public administration from Lagos State University, Ojo-Lagos (1987-1991). and Ladoke Akintola University of Technology, Ogbomosho, respectively and a PhD in Social work from the University of Jos, Jos. He has several other professional and executive certificates from other universities, notably a Certificate in International Health Consulting from the Liverpool School of Tropical Medicine.

== Career ==
He worked in the early stage of his career as a dental technologist at the 3rd Division (Nigeria) Medical Centre, Jos and became the head of Dental Technology Services in Abuja. Afterwards he began a lecturing career at the Institute of Development Administrations; a moderated Centre of University of Ibadan Distance Learning Centre as a lecturer II and grew along the ranks at the Institute of Development Administration/Distance Learning Centre, University of Ibadan and was appointed Rector of the Federal School of Dental Technology & Therapy Nigeria, in 2016 - a position he currently occupies.

He won the Most Outstanding and Best Performed Rector of Federal Polytechnics in Nigeria for the Year 2019 and the Ahmadu Bello Distinguished Leadership Award (Northern Youth Council of Nigeria) in the same year.

== Professional bodies ==
- Fellow, Institute of Development Administration of Nigeria
- Fellow, Institute of Social Work of Nigeria.
- Fellow, Institute of Healthcare Management of Nigeria
- Fellow, Institute of Corporate Administration of Nigeria .
