= Chris Abutu Garuba =

Nigerian politician

Major General Chris Abutu Garuba

Governor of Bauchi State
- In office August 1985 – December 1987
- Preceded by: Mohammed Sani Sami
- Succeeded by: Joshua Madaki

Personal details
- Born: 1948 (age 77–78) Otukpa Ogbadibo LGA, Benue State, Nigeria

Military service
- Allegiance: Nigeria
- Branch/service: Nigerian Army
- Rank: Major General

Chris Abutu Garuba was Governor of Bauchi State, Nigeria from August 1985 to December 1988 during the military regime of Major General Ibrahim Babangida. He was born in Ipole, Otukpa Ogbadibo Local Government Area of Benue State.

== Early life and education ==
Chris Abutu Garuba began his education at Mount St. Michael's Secondary School in Aliade, Benue State, which he attended from 1962-1966. He then attended St John's College, Kaduna in 1967, followed by the Nigerian Defence Academy, Kaduna where he received his officer's training from 1967-1970. He then attended the Royal School of Artillery, Larkhill in 1971, the United States Army Field Artillery School, Fort Sill from 1972-1974, the Command and Staff College, Jaji from 1978-1979, and finally the Defence Services Staff College, Wellington in 1981.

Garuba later attended Cameron University in Lawton, Oklahoma from 1974-1975, University of Oklahoma in Norman, Oklahoma from 1975-1978, and University of Jos in 1989.

== Military career ==
As Commander of 34 Self Propelled Artillery Brigade, Jos, Garuba lent his support to the coup of 27 August 1985 that brought General Ibrahim Babangida to power, leading the team that arrested the GOC of the 3rd Armoured Division, Brigadier Salihu Ibrahim. Immediately after the coup, he was promoted to Colonel and was appointed Governor of Bauchi.

Garuba was an energetic administrator in Bauchi. He initiated the Rural Transformation Programme to develop roads, water, electricity, agriculture and education. He upgraded the Abubakar Tafawa Balewa Stadium and built the Multi-Purpose Indoor Sports Hall and various other sports venues. He established Bauchi State Polytechnic (now known as Abubakar Tatari Ali Polytechnic), the Inland Bank, Bauchi State Television Authority and Bauchi Printing and Publishing Company.

After returning to the army, Garuba held a series of local and foreign appointments, and rose to the rank of major general before retiring. During the attempted coup of 22 April 1990 by Major Gideon Orkar, Brigadier Garuba was Corp Commander, Artillery. While the centre of the military command in the Dodan Barracks was being retaken, he deployed additional units within and around Lagos on standby. He was Chief Military Observer to the United Nations Angola Verification Mission II from July 1994 to February 1995, monitoring the cease fire between the rebel UNITA forces and the government troops. He was appointed Commandant, National War College, Abuja (colonels and brigadiers), and was a member of the Provisional Ruling Council in the Sani Abacha regime. Garuba was chief of staff during the transitional regime of General Abdusalami Abubakar, who handed over power at the start of the Nigerian Fourth Republic.

== Later career ==
In 2006, Garuba attempted to buy his official residence in Lagos when it was put up for sale, but the Presidential Implementation Committee under the Chairmanship of the Minister of State for Housing and Urban development, Grace Ekpiwhre, rejected his bid. In July 2008 there were rumors that Garuba would be appointed Chief of Staff to President Umaru Yar'Adua after General Mohammed Abdullahi had resigned from that position.

== Bibliography ==
- Chris Abutu Garuba (1999). The making of a state: reflections on the rural development programme in Bauchi state. Gabumo. p. 163.
- Chris Abutu Garuba (1999). The United nations peace mission in Angola: a personal odyssey. Gabumo. p. 170. ISBN 978-010-360-0.
