= 2003 Bauchi State gubernatorial election =

2003 gubernatorial election in Bauchi State, Nigeria

- (Nigeria)
- April 19, 2003
Nominee	Adamu Mu'azu	Ibrahim Jarma
Party	PDP	ANPP
Running mate	Abdulmalik Mohammed
Popular vote	1,198,130
Governor before election
Adamu Mu'azu
PDP
Elected Governor
Adamu Mu'azu
PDP

The 2003 Bauchi State gubernatorial election occurred on April 19, 2003. Incumbent Governor, PDP's Adamu Mu'azu won election for a second term, defeating ANPP's Ibrahim Jarma Katagum and three other candidates.

Adamu Mu'azu emerged winner in the PDP gubernatorial primary election. He retained Abdulmalik Mohammed as his running mate.

== Electoral system ==
The Governor of Bauchi State is elected using the plurality voting system.

== Results ==
A total of five candidates registered with the Independent National Electoral Commission to contest in the election. Incumbent Governor, Adamu Mu'azu won election for a second term, defeating four other candidates.

The total number of registered voters in the state was 2,130,557.

Candidate	Party	Votes	%
Adamu Mu'azu	People's Democratic Party (PDP)	1,198,130	100.00
Ibrahim Jarma Katagum	All Nigeria Peoples Party (ANPP)		
Alliance for Democracy (AD)			
Alhaji Dawood	United Nigeria People's Party (UNPP)		
Rahila Malumbus	Progressive Action Congress (PAC)		
Total		1,198,130	100.00
Registered voters/turnout		2,130,557	–
Source: Gamji, Africa Update, Dawodu
