= Ibrahim Gusau =

Nigerian politician

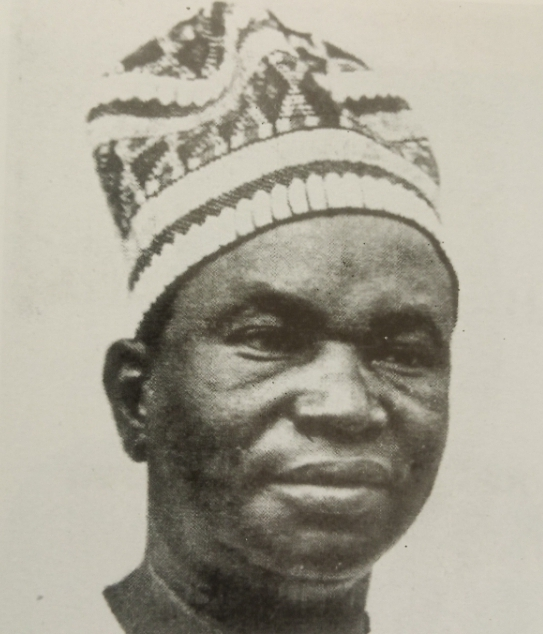

Ibrahim Gusau is a Nigerian politician and former minister for Agriculture and Industries.

== Early life and education ==
Gusau was born on 25 January 1925 in Sokoto, Sokoto State. Ibrahim Gusau started his elementary education at the Gusua Elementary School. He then transferred to Sokoto Central Elementary School before finishing his secondary education at Sokoto Middle School. He enrolled in Clerical Training College at Ahmadu Bello University in Zaria after completing his secondary education.

== Career ==
Ibrahim Gusau worked for the Sokoto Native Authority as a clerical officer from 1944 to 1946, a senior accountant from 1946 to 1948, a chief accountant from 1948 to 1950, the supervisor-in-chief of adult education, public enlightenment, and community development from 1951 to 1960, an assistant chief scribe from 1960 to 1963, and the registrar of Sultan's Court from 1963 to 1964. State Minister for Agriculture from 1964 until 1966.

=== Politics ===
He contested the primaries of the Gubernatorial seat of the National Party of Nigeria (NPN) in 1983 but lost to the incumbent Garba Nadama. He is also a member of the Sokoto Sultanate council with the title of Sarkin Malamai and was a member of the 1977 and 1995 constitutional assemblies. He was the National Chairman of the United Nigeria Congress (UNC) which merged with the United Nigeria Party (UNP) and Solidarity Group of Nigeria (SGN) led by Umaru Dikko to form the United Nigeria Congress Party (UNCP) during the Sani Abacha transition program.
