= Chadian–Nigerian War =

War over land control of Lake Chad islands

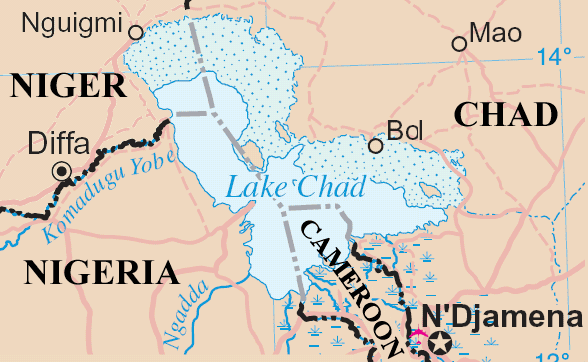
- Map of Lake Chad
Date	18 April 1983
Location	Borno State, Nigeria, and Lac, Chad
Result	Nigerian victory

Belligerents
Nigeria	Chad

Commanders and leaders
Shehu Shagari; Muhammadu Buhari	Hissène Habré; Idriss Déby

Casualties and losses
- More than 100 casualties

The Chadian–Nigerian War was a brief war that was fought over the control of islands on Lake Chad. The war started when a force led by Chadian Army chief-of-staff Idriss Déby invaded parts of Nigeria's Borno State, and ended with a Nigerian force led by Muhammadu Buhari expelling the Chadians and briefly invading Chadian territory.

== The war ==
The war occurred during the Chadian–Libyan conflict, and shortly after Chad had experienced a civil war in which Nigerian peacekeepers had found themselves caught in the crossfire. Further complicating Chadian-Nigerian relations were territorial disputes around Lake Chad, which had long been a source of tensions.

On 18 April 1983, a Chadian force invaded and occupied 19 islands on Lake Chad. The Nigerian government headed by Shehu Shagari ordered the deployment of troops from the 3rd Armoured Division of Jos headed by Muhammadu Buhari as the General Officer Commanding (GOC). The Chadian-Nigerian border was closed and troops mobilized to the region. However, due to pressure from smugglers, President Shehu Shagari ordered Buhari to reopen the border. The order was acted upon when the Chief of Army Staff, General Inua Wushishi communicated the order from the president. The Nigerian troops successfully recaptured the islands, and also pursued the Chadians 50 kilometers across the borders.

== Aftermath ==
The war was one of the causes behind the 1983 Nigerian coup d'état. Demonstrating President Shagari's powerlessness vis-à-vis his officers, which had enabled Buhari to openly act against orders, it highlighted the tensions between the military and the civilian government. On 31 December 1983, Muhammadu Buhari seized power in Nigeria, ending the Second Nigerian Republic.
