= Basa-Kontagora language =

Endangered Kainji language of Nigeria

Basa-Kontagora
- Native to: Nigeria
- Region: Kontagora
- Ethnicity: 30,000 (no date)
- Extinct: Early 2000s
- Language family: Niger–Congo?: Atlantic–Congo; Benue–Congo; Kainji; Basa languages; Kontagora–Gumna; Basa-Kontagora

Language codes
- ISO 639-3: bsr
- Glottolog: bass1259
- ELP: Bassa-Kontagora

Basa-Kontagora is an extinct Kainji language of Nigeria. It is spoken in Mariga, Niger State, near Kontagora and the Basa homeland. It is estimated that Basa-Kontagora has less than 10 native speakers as of 2010.
