= Adamu Mu'azu =

Nigerian politician

Governor of Bauchi State
- In office 29 May 1999 – 29 May 2007
- Preceded by: Abdul Mshelia
- Succeeded by: Malam Isa Yuguda

Personal details
- Born: 11 June 1955 (age 70) Bauchi State, Nigeria
- Party: PDP

Ahmad Adamu Mu'azu (born 11 June 1955) is a Nigerian politician who served as governor of Bauchi State from 1999 to 2007.

== Biography ==
Alhaji Ahmadu Adamu Mu'azu (born 11 June 1955) was governor of Bauchi State in Nigeria from 29 May 1999 to 29 May 2007. He had just been appointed PDP National Chairman Born in Boto, Tafawa Balewa Local Government Area of Bauchi State (then part of the Northern Region), Mu'azu attended primary school from 1962 to 1968. Between 1971 and 1975, he attended the Gindiri Boy's Secondary School in the then Benue-Plateau State where he obtained Division one (Distinction) in the West African School Certificate Examination. He then attended the School of Basic Studies at Ahmadu Bello University in Zaria and later received a Bachelor of Science degree in Quantity Surveying. From 1980 to 1983, Mu'azu worked as a Quantity Surveyor/Project Manager in the Ministry of Health and Ministry of Social Welfare, Youth, Sports and Culture in Kano State. He returned to his alma mater in 1983 and received a Masters of Science degree in Construction Management. He served as property manager of the Bauchi State Investment and Property Development Company before attending Birmingham University in the United Kingdom and receiving a second master's degree, this time in the area of Construction Economics. From 1984 until his election as state governor in 1999, Mu'azu worked as a businessman in the private sector. Between 1984 and 1987, he was chairman of the Federal Polytechnic in Idah and chairman of the Benue-Plateau Construction Company in Jos from 1986 to 1990. He was also a member of the Bauchi State Scholarship Board during this period. Between 1987 and 1997, he served in a number of capacities including director of the Nigeria Ports Authority and a member of the Bauchi State Rural Development Council. He won 56 percent of the vote in the 1999 gubernatorial election and took office on 29 May 1999. He was re-elected for a second four-year term in 2003. He ran for a Senate seat in the 2007 general election, but was defeated.

He served as the National Chairman of People's Democratic Party (PDP) from 2014 to 2015.

== Bauchi State governor ==
In January 1999, Mu'azu contested and won the gubernatorial race of Bauchi State on the People's Democratic Party (PDP) platform. He was sworn in on 29 May 1999. He was reelected governor on 19 April 2003 with a total of 1,198,130 votes.
