= Basa languages =

Cluster of Kainji languages spoken in Nigeria

Basa
- Geographic distribution: Nigeria
- Ethnicity: Bassa people
- Linguistic classification: Niger–Congo?: Atlantic–Congo; Volta-Congo; Benue–Congo; Kainji languages; Basa

Language codes
- ISO 639-3: –
- Glottolog: basa1279

Basa
- Person: bu-Basa
- People: a-Basa
- Language: ru-Basa

Basa is a cluster of Kainji languages scattered across Nigeria. They are spoken in distinct communities from Niger State in the northwest to Benue State in the south-centre. This means that the Basa may be the next most widespread people in Nigeria after the Hausa and Fula. Distant groups are not aware of each other, and those near their apparent homeland near the Kambari (Basa-Kontagora and Basa-Gumna) have lost their language.

== Languages ==
There are eight Basa languages:

- - - Basa-Kontagora
    - Basa-Gumna
    - Bassa Nge (Bassa nupe)
  - Kɔrɔmba (Basa-Gurmana)
- - - Basa-Gurara
    - Basa-Kwali
  - - Basa-Benue (Basa-Kwomu)
    - Basa-Makurdi
    - Bassa Nge (Nupe Bassa)
