= Yakubu Mu'azu =

Nigerian politician

Brigadier General Yakubu Mu'azu

Administrator of Sokoto State
- In office 9 December 1993 – 22 Aug 1996
- Preceded by: Yahaya Abdulkarim
- Succeeded by: Rasheed Raji

Military service
- Allegiance: Nigeria
- Branch/service: Nigerian Army
- Rank: Brigadier General

Yakubu Mu'azu was Administrator of Sokoto State, Nigeria from 9 December 1993 to 22 August 1996.

== Military career ==
After he joined the army, Yakubu Mu'azu attended the Nigerian Defense Academy and later the Young Officers' course in Jaji. Lieutenant Yakubu Muazu was appointed Military Assistant (MA) to General Sani Abacha. By September 1993, he was still Abacha's MA but had been promoted to Colonel.

In December of that year, Abacha appointed him Administrator of Sokoto State. As the administrator of Sokoto State, on orders from Abacha, he deposed Alhaji Ibrahim Dasuki as Sultan of Sokoto on 20 April 1996 and replaced him with Muhamadu Maccido. In May 1996, Yakubu Mu'azu set up a panel to investigate the finances of the Sokoto State's council of chiefs, which had been chaired by Sultan Ibrahim Dasuki. He said this was normal procedure with a change of office and was not part of a witch hunt.

After his tenure as governor of Sokoto State ended in August 1996, Yakubu Mu'azu was appointed commander of the Brigade of Guards. In December 1996, Godwin Agbroko, editor of the weekly magazine The Week, was arrested by three men who said that they were security agents. The arrest may have been connected to an article in the December 16–23 edition of The Week that discussed a dispute between Mu'azu and Army Chief of Staff Ishaya Bamaiyi. Shortly after the restoration of democracy in May 1999, the government forced all armed forces officers who had served in military governments for six or more months to retire. Mu'azu was among those affected.

== Later events ==
He was one of a group of former military administrators who formed the United Nigeria Development Forum (UNDF), a political pressure group, in April 2001.

In February 2007, a group of soldiers and civilians invaded and trashed the house of a Lagos banker, Dr Adeyinka Adedji. They said they had been sent by General Yakubu Mu'azu (rtd). The house had previously been the property of Mu'azu.

In June 2008, Mu'azu was chairman of a committee investigating a fire that gutted the Department of Planning, Research and Statistics of the Bauchi State Ministry of Health in April 2008. In his report, he said that the fire was pure sabotage. In April 2009, Mu'azu was appointed chair of a commission of inquiry into the February 2009 civil disturbances in the Bauchi metropolis.
