= Joshua Madaki =

Nigerian politician

Major General Joshua Mamman Madaki

Governor of Bauchi State
- In office December 1987 – August 1990
- Preceded by: Chris Abutu Garuba
- Succeeded by: Abu Ali

Governor of Plateau State
- In office August 1990 – January 1992
- Preceded by: Aliyu Kama
- Succeeded by: Fidelis Tapgun

Personal details
- Born: July 6, 1947 Kaura LGA, Kaduna State, Nigeria
- Died: May 7, 2003 (aged 55)

Military service
- Allegiance: Nigeria
- Branch/service: Nigerian Army
- Rank: Major General
- Commands: Commander, Brigade of Guards (1985)

Joshua Mamman Madaki (6 July 1947 – 7 May 2003) was Governor of Bauchi State, Nigeria from December 1987 to August 1990 and then of Plateau State from August 1990 to January 1992 during the military regime of Major General Ibrahim Babangida.

== Background ==
Joshua Mamman Madaki was born on 6 July 1947 in Manchok, Kaura Local Government Area of Kaduna State. He attended St. Paul's College Wusasa. After joining the army, he was among the fourth intake to the Nigerian Defence Academy.

== Military career ==
During the coup of 27 August 1985, when General Ibrahim Babangida took power, Lt. Colonel Madaki was in command of the 6th Guards Battalion in Bonny Camp. His battalion was placed on standby on Lagos Island, and charged with securing the eastern approaches to Victoria Island. Madaki was promoted to Commander of the Brigade of Guards after the coup.

Babangida promoted Madaki to Colonel and appointed him Governor of Bauchi State in December 1987. He was transferred to Plateau State from August 1990 to January 1992. There was a crisis among the Dong, Tudun Wada and Kabong communities in Jos North, Plateau State during the census of 1991 which prevented the census creating records of these areas. Colonel Madaki set up a judicial commission to determine the ownership of those areas.

== Later career ==
After retiring from the army, Madaki became a member of the National Democratic Coalition (NADECO), a predominantly Yorubu group pressing the Sani Abacha regime for return to democracy. In the lead-up to the Nigerian Fourth Republic, Madaki became a member of the People's Democratic Party (PDP). In August 2001, Madaki was appointed President of the Nigeria Rugby Football Association. In June 2002, it was reported that he was planning to run for governor of Kaduna State in April 2003 on the All People's Party) (APP) platform, allied with the All Nigeria People's Party.

In October 2002, he moved to the Alliance for Democracy (AD). He planned to run for governor of Kaduna on that platform.

Madaki died in a car crash on 7 May 2003, when one of the tires on his jeep burst, causing the vehicle to somersault.
