= Mohammed Kaliel =

Nigerian politician

Colonel Mohammed Kaliel

Federal Minister of Water Resources
- In office 1999 – 13 June 2001

Commander of the Brigade of Guards
- In office 1981–1984
- Preceded by: Brig. Mamman Vatsa
- Succeeded by: Lt-Col. Sabo Aliyu

Governor of Bauchi State
- In office March 1976 – July 1978
- Succeeded by: Garba Duba

Personal details
- Born: 17 June 1944 Kebbi State, Nigeria
- Died: 10 March 2015 (aged 70)

Military service
- Allegiance: Nigeria
- Branch/service: Nigerian Army
- Years of service: 1967 - 1984
- Rank: Colonel

Mohammed Bello Kaliel (died 10 March 2015) was a Nigerian Army Colonel and the first Governor of Bauchi State, Nigeria after it was created on 3 February 1976 when North-Eastern State was divided into Bauchi, Borno, and Gongola states, during the military regime of General Olusegun Obasanjo. He held office until July 1978.

== Army career ==
Mohammed Bello Kaliel was commissioned into the army in the Nigerian Defence Academy first regular course which ran from 1964-1967. Other notable officers in Kaliel's cohort were Aliyu Mohammed Gusau, Joshua Dogonyaro, and Salihu Ibrahim among others. From 1972–1974, he was an instructor at the Nigerian Defence Academy. In February 1976, Mohammed Kaliel was appointed governor of Bauchi State by the head of state, General Murtala Muhammed, shortly before he was killed in an abortive coup attempt. Taking office in March 1976, he brought a team of experienced civil servants from Maiduguri to establish the new state's administration. He found a state with no electricity and limited water supply from boreholes, and made improving this basic infrastructure his first priority.

Kaliel was Commandant at the Nigerian Resettlement Center, Lagos from 1978–1980, Director of Logistics and Defence (1980–1981) and Commandant, Brigade of Guards, Lagos (1981–1984). In December 1983, while Kaliel was on leave from the Brigade of Guards, a coup resulted in Major-General Muhammadu Buhari becoming head of state.

== Later career ==
Kaliel retired shortly after the coup in 1984. After the restoration of democracy in May 1999, he was appointed Federal minister of Water Resources between 1999 and 2001. In January 2001, he met the Zamfara State Governor, Ahmed Sani Yerima, who told him that Gusau Dam could dry up soon, and asked the Federal Government to transfer water from the Bakolori Dam to the state capital, Gusau. Kaliel said the Federal Government was committed to providing quality water to all Nigerians, and would soon provide assistance to the states, with priority given to Gusau. He was replaced in a cabinet shuffle on 13 June 2001.

In May 2005, he was appointed to the board of All States Trust Bank Plc.

On 10 March 2015, Bello Kaliel died in a hospital in Turkey.
