= Koromba language =

Kainji language spoken in Nigeria

Kɔrɔmba
- Basa-Gurmana
- Native to: Nigeria
- Native speakers: (2,000 cited 1987)
- Language family: Niger–Congo?: Atlantic–Congo; Benue–Congo; Kainji; Basa languages; Kɔrɔmba

Language codes
- ISO 639-3: buj
- Glottolog: basa1281

Kɔrɔmba, or Basa-Gurmana, is a Kainji language of Nigeria.
