= James Kalau =

Nigerian politician

Wing Commander James Yana Kalau

Governor of Bauchi State
- In office 9 December 1993 – 14 September 1994
- Preceded by: Dahiru Mohammed
- Succeeded by: Rasheed Adisa Raji

Military service
- Allegiance: Nigeria
- Branch/service: Nigerian Air Force
- Rank: Wing Commander

James Yana Kalau was Governor of Bauchi State, Nigeria, from December 1993 to September 1994 during the military regime of General Sani Abacha. He achieved little, in part handicapped by crippling fuel shortages.
