= 72nd Special Forces Battalion =

- Active: October 1980; 45 years ago (as 72 Paratrooper Battalion); April 2010; 16 years ago (as 72nd Special Forces Battalion)
- Country: Nigeria
- Type: Special Forces
- Role: Small-scale infantry/SF
- Size: Battalion
- Part of: Nigerian Army Special Operations Command
- Garrison/HQ: Makurdi, Benue State
- Nickname: The Silent Killers
- Motto: "Who Dares Win"

Commanders
- Current commander: Lieutenant Colonel A. S. Abdullahi

The 72nd Special Forces Battalion is a special forces unit of the Nigerian Army. It is stationed at Makurdi.

== History ==
Previously it appears to have been the 72 Paratrooper Battalion, including in the late 1980s; it may have been re-designated circa 2010. There are indications that it may be an independent battalion which may report directly to Defence Headquarters.

The 72 Paratrooper Battalion was involved in the events of October 22 to 24, 2001, when several hundred Army soldiers of the Yola Brigade of 3rd Division killed more than two hundred unarmed civilians and destroyed homes, shops, public buildings and other property in more than seven towns and villages in Benue State, in central eastern Nigeria. The 72 Battalion appears to have tried to intercede with the Yola Brigade to avoid further killings, in the midst of the events.

The battalion was reported to have been involved in Operation Lafiya Dole in early 2016, against Boko Haram.

== Commanders ==
- Major Jhabba Yantar Zubov
- Colonel Timothy Lagbaja (circa 2015)
- Lieutenant Colonel A.D. Alhassan
- Lieutenant Colonel SI AGWOM (Present Comander 2024 still Date)
