= 3rd Division (Nigeria) =

Nigerian army division

3rd Armoured Division
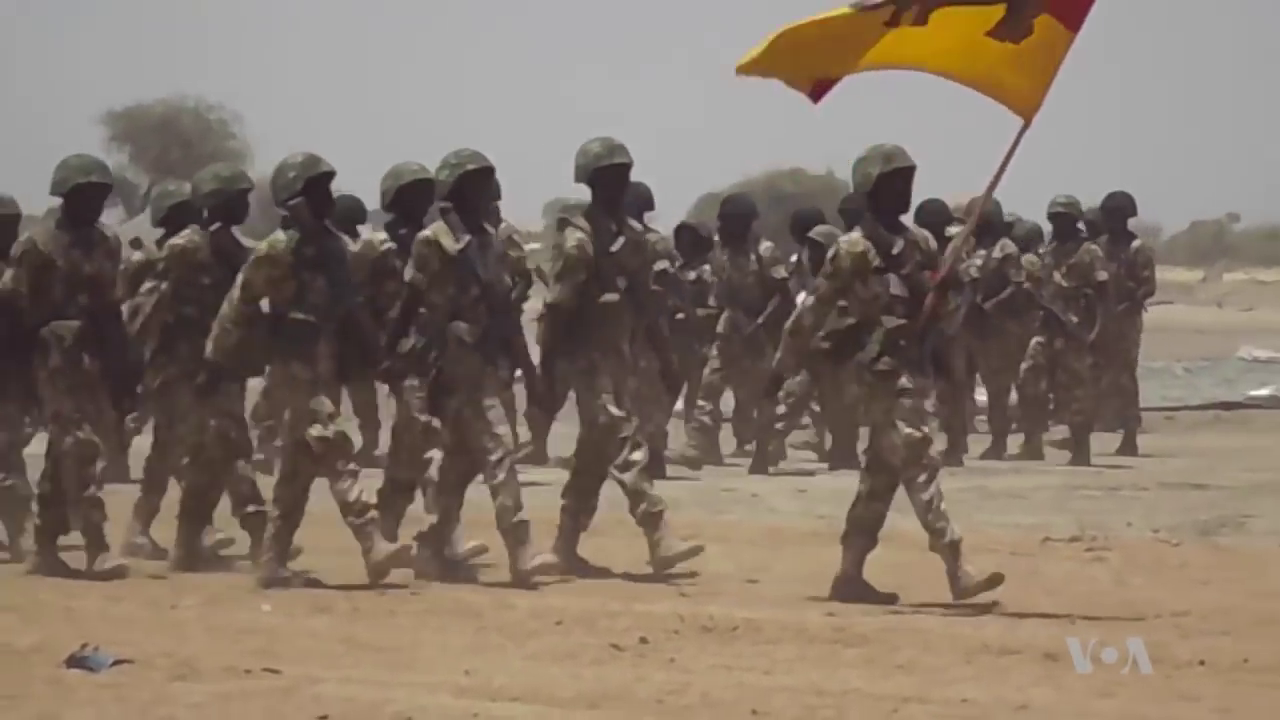
- A military parade of the 3rd Division with its unit colours during an exercise in the Sambisa Forest in 2017.
- Active: 1967–present
- Country: Nigeria
- Type: Mechanized Infantry
- Role: Combat support
- Size: Division
- Part of: Nigerian Army
- Garrison/HQ: Jos, Nigeria
- Engagements: Nigerian Civil War; Chadian–Nigerian War; Zaki Biam massacre; Boko Haram insurgency

Commanders
- General Officer Commanding: Major General Abdulsalam Abubakar
- Notable commanders: Brigadier Benjamin Adekunle; General Olusegun Obasanjo; Lieutenant General Theophilus Danjuma; Major General Muhammadu Buhari; Lieutenant General Salihu Ibrahim; Lieutenant General Joshua Dogonyaro; Brigadier General Tunji Olurin

The 3rd Armoured Division is a division of the Nigerian Army. The division is headquartered at Jos, Plateau State.

== History ==
=== Founding and Civil War ===
The 3rd Division of the Nigerian Army dates to August–September 1967 during the Nigerian Civil War. At that time 1 Area Command at Kaduna was redesignated 1 Infantry Division, 2 Division was formed under Colonel Murtala Mohammed, and the then Lagos Garrison Organisation was renamed 3 Infantry Division, later to be renamed 3 Marine Commando under Colonel Benjamin Adekunle.

Then-Colonel Olusegun Obasanjo took over command of 3 Division from Benjamin Adekunle on 12 May 1969. He carried out a thorough reorganisation of the division's administration and eliminated the sector level of command which had been operating between the division and brigade level. He also formed a new reserve battalion, the Special Task Force, later to become 'Apollo Battalion' after the Apollo 11 Moon landing of 20 July 1969, which was not to be used for ground-holding duties.

At the end of the Civil War, the three divisions of the army were reorganised into four divisions, with each controlling territories running from North to South in order to deemphasise the former regional structure. Each division thus had access to the sea thereby making triservice cooperation and logistic support easier. This deployment formula was later abandoned in favour of the present assignment of sectors to the divisions. Thus 1 Division with HQ at Kaduna is allocated the North West sector; 2 Division with HQ at lbadan South West sector, 3 Division with HQ at Jos North East sector and 82 Division with HQ at Enugu South East sector.

=== Later operations ===
3rd Armoured Division was responsible in April 1983 for the security of areas bordering Chad during the Chadian–Nigerian War.

From October 22 to 24, 2001, several hundred Army soldiers of the Yola Brigade (23 Brigade) of 3rd Armoured Division killed more than two hundred unarmed civilians and destroyed homes, shops, public buildings and other property in more than seven towns and villages in Benue State, in central eastern Nigeria. The 72nd Special Forces Battalion appears to have tried to intercede with the Yola Brigade to avoid further killings, in the midst of the events.

== Divisional components ==
=== Structure ===
The division has the following structure:

- Divisional Headquarters (Rukuba Cantonment, Jos)
  - 23 Armoured Brigade (Yola)
    - 231 Tank Battalion
    - 232 Tank Battalion
  - 33 Artillery Brigade
    - 331 Field Artillery Regiment
    - 332 Field Artillery Regiment
  - 43 Engineer Brigade
    - 431 Field Engineer Regiment
    - 432 Field Engineer Regiment
    - 43 Field Workshop & EOD Detachment
  - 243 Reconnaissance Battalion
  - 3rd Division Signals & Logistics Formations
    - 3 Division Signals Regiment
    - 73 Supply and Transport Brigade
    - 3 Division Ordnance Services
    - 3 Division Electrical and Mechanical Engineers (DEME)
    - 3 Division Military Hospital

=== Equipment ===
Main battle tanks in Nigerian service include the T-72 and T-54/55 (together seemingly 36 vehicles in service) and over 100 Vickers Mark 3s.

== Commanders ==
- Colonel Benjamin Adekunle (July 1967 – May 1969)
- Colonel Olusegun Obasanjo (16 May 1969 – 1974)
- Brigadier Theophilus Danjuma (1974–1975)
- Brigadier Emmanuel Abisoye (1975–1978)
- Major General Muhammadu Buhari (1980–1983)
- Brigadier Salihu Ibrahim (1983–1985)
- Major General Joshua Dogonyaro (1985–1987)
- Brigadier Tunji Olurin (1990–1993)
- Major General Peter Gyang Sha (1994–1998)
- Major General E. Archibong (March – July 1999)
- Major General T. S. Akande (July 1999 – February 2002)
- Major General Joseph Owoniyi (February 2002 – February 2003)
- Major General Danmadami Diaji (February 2003 – February 2005)
- Major General Isiaku Dikko (January 2005 – January 2006)
- Major General Joseph Oshanupin (May – July 2007)
- Major General Olakunle Akinyemi (July 2007 – June 2008)
- Major General Saleh Maina (January 2009 – September 2010)
- Major General Sunday Idoko (September 2010 – August 2011)
- Major General Adamu Marwa (September 2011 – February 2012)
- Major General Jack Okechukwu Naobo (February 2012 – January 2013)
- Major General Ebiobwei Bonna Awala (1 February 2013 – 9 January 2014)
- Major General John Nwaogo (January 2014 – October 2014)
- Major General John S. Zaruwa (February – October 2014)
- Major General Fatai Oladipo Alli (October 2014 – January 2015)
- Major General Hassan Umaru (July – October 2015)
- Brigadier General Muhammed Sani Ali (December 2015 – March 2016)
- Brigadier General Elvis Njoku (March 2016 – February 2017)
- Major General Peter Dauke (February – June 2017)
- Major General Benjamin Ahanotu (June 2017 – August 2018)
- Major General Benson Akinroluyo (August – November 2018)
- Major General Nuhu Angbazo (August 2018 – 2020)
- Major General Musa Danmadami (September 2020 – March 2021)
- Major General Bello Abdullahi Muhammed (March – July 2021)
- Major General Ibrahim Sallau Ali (July 2021 – 20 January 2023)
- Major General Abdulsalami Bagudu Ibrahim (20 January 2023 – 8 July 2023)
- Major General Abdulsalam E. Abubakar (8 July 2023 – 8 January 2025)
- Major General Folusho Oyinlola ( 8 January 2025 - present)
