= Basa-Benue language =

Kainji language of Nigeria

Basa
- Basa-Benue
- ru-basa
- Native to: Nigeria
- Region: Benue River
- Native speakers: 300,000 (2020)
- Language family: Niger–Congo?: Atlantic–Congo; Benue–Congo; Kainji; Basa languages; Basa
- Dialects: Basa-Kwomu (Basa-Komo); Basa-Makurdi; Basa-Gurara; Basa-Kwali; Bassa Nge (Bassa Nupe)

Language codes
- ISO 639-3: bzw
- Glottolog: basa1282

Basa
- Person: bu-Basa
- People: a-Basa
- Language: ru-Basa

The Basa language, disambiguated as Basa-Benue, and also called Abacha, Abatsa, ru-Basa, Rubassa, is a Kainji language spoken in central Nigeria, in the vicinity of Bassa, Ankpa, Nasarawa, Gurara, Kwali and Makurdi. Blench (2008) notes that Basa-Makurdi, Basa-Gurara and Basa-Kwali are separate varieties from Basa-Kwomu or Basa-Komo of Bassa, Ankpa and Nasarawa Local Government Areas and other Bassa speakers are Bassa Nge, also known as Bassa Nupe.

Basa speakers also often speak the Igala language, the Ebira language or the Nupe language.

== Dialects and distribution ==
- Basa-Kwomu (Basa-Komo) dialect spoken in the states of Kogi and Nasarawa in Bassa, Ankpa and Nasarawa Local Government Areas.
- Basa-Makurdi dialect spoken in the state of Benue in Makurdi Local Government Area.
- Basa-Gurara dialect spoken in the state of Niger in Gurara Local Government Area
- Basa-Kwali dialect spoken in the Federal Capital Territory in Kwali Local Government Area.
- Bassa Nge (Bassa Nupe) dialect spoken in Kogi State and Niger State by the Bassa Nge people who also speak the Tako dialect of the Nupe language.
