= Mohammed Sani Sami =

Nigerian politician (1943–2025)

Major General Mohammed Sani Sami

Governor of Bauchi State
- In office January 1984 – August 1985
- Preceded by: Tatari Ali
- Succeeded by: Chris Abutu Garuba

Personal details
- Born: 24 October 1943 Zuru, Northern Nigeria, Colony and Protectorate of Nigeria
- Died: 16 August 2025 (aged 81) London, England
- Party: none (Military)

Military service
- Allegiance: Nigeria
- Branch: Nigerian Army
- Rank: Major General

Mohammed Sani Sami (24 October 1943 – 16 August 2025) was a Nigerian politician who was Governor of Bauchi State, Nigeria from January 1984 to August 1985 during the military regime of Major General Muhammadu Buhari.

== Life and career ==
Mohammed Sani Sami was born in Zuru in Northern Nigeria. He joined the army on 10 December 1962, and attended training courses with Ibrahim Babangida. He attended the Mons Officer Cadet School in Aldershot, England and was commissioned on 25 July 1963. General Murtala Muhammed, head of state from July 1975 to February 1976, appointed Lieutenant Colonel Sani Sami commander of the Brigade of Guards.

He was appointed governor of Bauchi State after a coup on 31 December 1983 that brought General Muhammadu Buhari to power. He held office until August 1985, when General Ibrahim Babangida took over from Buhari. He upgraded medical facilities, and undertook a major agricultural development program named "back to land". During his governorship, the world handball championship was held in Bauchi State.

In October 1984, facing a new wave of religious fanaticism, he warned that prohibitions on open air religious preaching remained in force. He also stated that the decision to demolish some Christian churches to make way for a new ring road was not in any way an attack on that religion, and said that the government had allocated land for the Catholic mission to build a new church.

Sami retired as a major general on 3 September 1990. He later became the Emir of Zuru, in Kebbi State.

Sami died after a brief illness in London, on 16 August 2025, at the age of 81.
