= Federal School of Dental Technology & Therapy =

The Federal College of Dental Technology & Therapy is a higher education institute in Trans-Ekulu, Enugu State, Nigeria. It was established in 1955 in Lagos as the Federal School of Dental Technology and Hygiene, training dental technicians and hygienists. It became the Federal School of Dental Technology and Therapy in 1978, with the larger goal of training dental technologists and therapists. The school moved to its present location in 1982. The school is funded by the Federal Government of Nigeria. Graduates of school of Dental Technology are awarded a Higher National Diploma after five years, and graduates will go for one-year internship before professional registration. Graduates may practice as professionals after registration with the Dental Technologists or Dental Therapists Registration Boards of Nigeria. *NUC Approves FEDCODTTEN's Undergraduate Degree Programmes*

The National Universities Commission (NUC) has approved the running of different undergraduate degree programmes in the Federal College of Dental Technology and Therapy, Enugu. According to a letter dated February 10, 2021, the Commission authorised the running of the programmes in the precinct of the College. The Commission listed the accredited undergraduate programmes and the degrees to be awarded as: Biomedical Technology (B.Tech), Dental Technology (B.Tech), Prosthetics and Orthotics (B.Tech) and Public Health Technology (B.Tech). The B.Tech degree in Public Health involves four main areas of specialisation. The four areas of specialisation which are already running as separate departments are: Public Health, Dental Therapy, Dental Nursing and Social Work. The programmes had earlier commenced in affiliation with the Federal University of Technology, Owerri (FUTO). With the current approval, the status of the College as an authorised degree awarding institution is given the required standing.

The school was once the only school which trained dental technologists and therapists in Nigeria, until recently when other schools were established for this purpose.

In August 2009, the new chairman of the board said it had been largely static over the years, and that he was looking for federal and state funding for upgrades. The name of the Rector of the College is Dr. John Emaimo.

== See also ==
- List of polytechnics in Nigeria
