= Dahiru Mohammed =

Nigerian politician

Governor of Bauchi State
- In office January 1992 – November 1993
- Preceded by: Colonel Abu Ali
- Succeeded by: James Kalau

Personal details
- Born: 24 September 1942 (age 83) Deba, Gombe State, Nigeria

Alhaji Dahiru Mohammed Deba (born 1942) is a Nigerian politician who was elected Governor of Bauchi State, Nigeria between January 1992 and November 1993 during the Nigerian Third Republic, leaving office after the military coup that brought General Sani Abacha to power.

Deba was born on 24 September 1942, in Deba, then in Bauchi State and now in Gombe State. He was given the traditional title of Wazirin Deba.

Dahiru was elected governor in 1991 on the platform of the National Republican Convention (NRC). His achievements as governor included construction of hospitals, including the Alkaleri General Hospital and Primary Health Centres at Dambam, Zambuk, Bambam and Burra, and the foundation for the Gombe Referral Hospital. His government built two new state hotels at Jama'are and Ningi. He launched the 200 million Naira Education Trust Fund. His tenure was cut short in November 1993 when General Sani Abacha seized power.

Dahiru together with his closest political associate Mohammed Ibrahim Hassan, a former Minister of Mines and Power in the Second Republic and also Baraden Gombe became the two active stalwarts of the Democratic Party of Nigeria (DPN), in the newly created Gombe State but later fell apart because of collision in ambition to become the first elective Governor of the State. He assisted Danjuma Goje, who later became governor of Gombe State, in the 1998 senatorial elections held by Abacha, which were annulled after Abacha's death.
