= Theophilus Bamigboye =

Nigerian military officer (born 1951)

Military Administrator of Bauchi State
- In office 22 August 1996 – August 1998
- Preceded by: Rasheed Raji
- Succeeded by: Abdul Mshelia

Military Administrator of Osun State
- In office August 1998 – 29 May 1999
- Preceded by: Anthony Obi
- Succeeded by: Adebisi Akande

Personal details
- Born: 1951 (age 74–75) Omu-Aran, Irepodun LGA, Kwara State, Nigeria

Theophilus O Bamigboye (born 1951) is a retired Nigerian Colonel who served as Military Administrator of Bauchi State and then Osun State before the return to democracy in May 1999. He later joined politics, competing for governorship of Kwara State in 2007.

== Background and military career ==
Theophilus O Bamigboye was born in 1951 in Omu-Aran in Irepodun Local Government in Kwara State. His brother is Brigadier General David Bamigboye, Military Governor of Kwara State from May 1967 until July 1975. He married the socialite Enitan Allen, who was conspicuous during his tenure as governor of Bauchi and Osun states. They got divorced later.

Theophilus O Bamigboye served as Military Administrator of Bauchi State (August 1996 - August 1998) during the military regime of General Sani Abacha. He invested in education, constructing primary and secondary schools buildings and providing equipment and improved incentives for teachers. He provided a new permanent site for Bauchi Radio Corporation (BRC). During his tenure Gombe State was created out of Bauchi.

He was appointed Military Administrator of Osun State in August 1998, handing over power to the civilian governor Adebisi Akande in May 1999.

== Later political career ==
Theophilus Bamigboye joined politics as a member of the People's Democratic Party (PDP), later joining the Democratic People's Party (DPP), and later still the Accord Party. In April 2007 he unsuccessfully competed on the Accord Party platform for governorship of Kwara State. At one point in the campaign, gun wielding youths started shooting when Bamigboye was speaking at a rally of his supporters, but he escaped unharmed. Bamigboye appealed the electoral result where Dr Bukola Saraki had won the race for governor, claiming there had been widespread malpractices, corruption, violence, intimidation and exclusion of the photograph and logo of the Accord Party from the ballot papers, but in July 2008 an electoral appeal court upheld Saraki victory.

In September 2009 Theophilus Bamigboye returned to the PDP and was reconciled with Olusola Saraki, father of the incumbent governor. He said that his decision to leave the PDP had been a mistake, and it was time to retrace his steps. He also said he would be willing to serve as governor of Kwara State if needed.
