= List of governors of Bauchi State =

Governor of Bauchi State
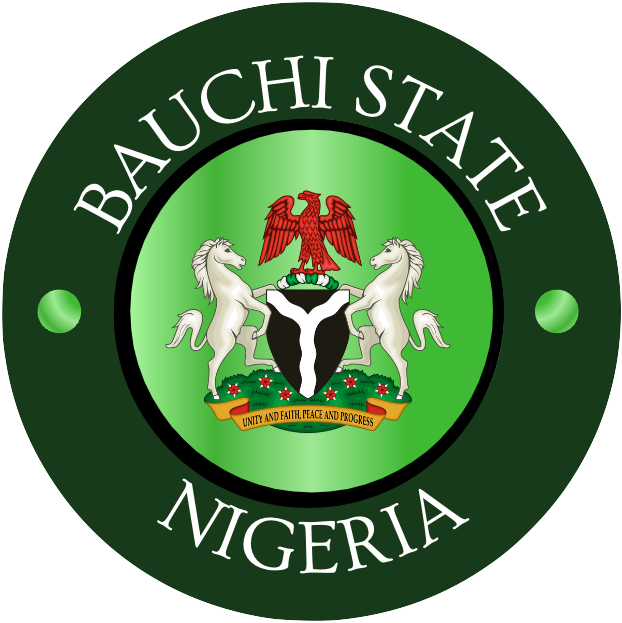
- Seal of Bauchi State of Nigeria
- Incumbent; Bala Mohammed since 29 May 2019
- Government of Bauchi State
- Style: Governor (informal); His Excellency (courtesy)
- Type: Head of state Head of government
- Reports to: President of Nigeria
- Seat: Bauchi
- Appointer: Popular vote
- Term length: Four years, renewable once consecutively
- Constituting instrument: Constitution of Nigeria
- Formation: 3 February 1976

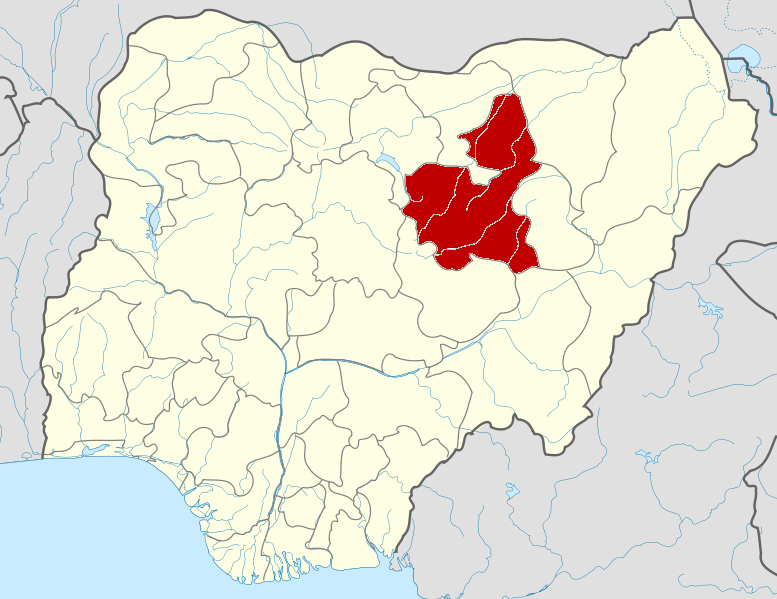
Location of Bauchi State in Nigeria

Bauchi State, located in the North East geopolitical zone of Nigeria, has experienced various forms of leadership since Nigeria's independence in 1960, including both military and civilian administrations. At the time of independence, the territory now known as Bauchi State was part of the Northern Region. In the state reorganization of 1967, the Northern Region was divided into six states, and the area comprising present-day Bauchi became part of the North-Eastern State. The first military governor of the newly created Northeastern state was Brigadier Musa Usman, who was replaced in 1975 by Muhammadu Buhari. Bauchi State was created out of the Northeastern state in 1976, and Colonel Mohammed Bello Kaliel was the first military governor from 1976 to 1978. He was succeeded by another military administrator, Garba Duba, during the continued military regimes.

In 1979, Abubakar Tatari Ali became the first elected civilian governor of Bauchi State, serving under the National Party of Nigeria (NPN). His administration was cut short in 1983 by a military coup, after which various military governors took charge, including Chris Abutu Garuba, Joshua Madaki and Abu Ali. Between 1992 and 1993, there was a brief democratic government led by Dahiru Mohammed of the National Republican Convention (NRC), which was later overthrown by James Kalau, an administrator appointed by the General Sani Abacha Government. Hence, military administrators ruled Bauchi State from 1993 up to 1999.

In 1999, Ahmadu Adamu Mu'azu was elected as the civilian governor of Bauchi State and served two terms from 1999 to 2007 under the People's Democratic Party (PDP). In 2015, Mohammed Abdullahi Abubakar of the All Progressives Congress (APC) became governor and served until 2019. Bala Mohammed of the PDP took office in 2019 and was re-elected in 2023 for a second term. He currently serves as the incumbent governor of Bauchi State.

== List of governors ==
=== Northern Region ===
At the time of Nigeria's independence in 1960, the country was divided into three regions: the Northern Region, the Western Region, and the Eastern Region. Sir Ahmadu Bello served as the first Premier of the Northern Region under the Northern People's Congress (NPC). Ahmadu Bello was assassinated in the 1966 during the first Nigeria military coup organised by General Aguiyi Ironsi. Also, Major General Johnson Aguiyi-Ironsi was assassinated in July 1966 counter-coup, and Lieutenant Colonel Yakubu Gowon became the Head of State. He abolished the existing regional structure in May 1967 and created twelve new states from the former regions. One of these newly created states was the North-Eastern State.

=== North-Eastern State ===
The first Military governor of the North-Eastern State was Brigadier Musa Usman, who was appointed by General Yakubu Gowon following the creation of the state in 1967.He administered the state from 1967 until 1975. After the bloodless coup of 29 July 1975, which removed Gowon from power and brought General Murtala Muhammad to office, Musa Usman was replaced by Colonel Muhammadu Buhari Buhari served as the military administrator of the North-Eastern State until February 1976, when Murtala Muhammad was assassinated in a failed coup led by Lieutenant Colonel Bukar Suka Dimka.

Military administrators of North-Eastern State
Portrait	Name	Title	Term in office	Notes
Portrait of Musa Usman	Musa Usman (1940–1991)	Military governor	May 1967 – July 1975	The first military governor after the July 1967 Coup
Portrait of Muhammadu Buhari	Muhammadu Buhari (1942–2025)	Military governor	July 1975 – February 1976	The last military governor of the Northeastern region

=== Bauchi State ===
In 1976, under the military administration of General Murtala Muhammed, the former North-Eastern State was subdivided into three new states: Bauchi, Borno, and Gongola.

Bauchi state officially came into existence on 3 February 1976. The state's first military governor was Brigadier General Mohammad Bello Khaliel, who assumed office in March 1976, succeeding Colonel Muhammadu Buhari, the last military administrator of the North-Eastern State. Khaliel served until July 1978, after which Colonel Garba Duba was appointed and served as governor until October 1979, during the military regime of General Olusegun Obasanjo.

In 1979, Abubakar Tatari Ali was elected as the governor of Bauchi State under National Party of Nigeria and his tenure lasted till 1983. From 1984 to 1985, Colonel Mohammed Sani Sami served as the military governor of the state. Abu Ali, a military governor, was appointed in 1990 and handed over to a democratic governor in 1992. Bauchi State was under the democratic rule of Dahiru Mohammed for just a year before power was handed over to another military governor in 1993.From 1993 to 1999, Bauchi State was under military rule, with a series of appointed administrators: James Kalau (1993–1994), Rasheed Adisa Raji (1994–1996), Theophilus Bamigboye (1996–1998), and Abdul Mshelia.

In 1999, Ahmad Adamu Mu'azu of the People's Democratic Party (PDP) served as governor till 2007.He was succeeded by Isa Yuguda, initially elected under the All Nigeria Peoples Party (ANPP) in 2007, but who officially decamped to the PDP in June 2009. Yuguda served two terms until 2015, when Mohammed Abdullahi Abubakar of the All Progressives Congress (APC) took office. In 2019, Bala Mohammed of the PDP was elected governor and remains the incumbent as of 2025.

Heads of the government of Bauchi State
Portrait	Name	Term in office	Political party
Mohammed Bello Kaliel headshot in Official Military Attire for Identification	Mohammed Bello Kaliel	March 1976 – July 1978	Military governor
Garba Duba in Official Military Attire	Garba Duba	July 1978 – October 1979	Military governor
Abubakar Tatari Ali headshot for recognition	Abubakar Tatari Ali	October 1979 – December 1983	NPN
—	Mohammed Sani Sami	January 1984 – August 1985	Military governor
—	Chris Abutu Garuba	August 1985 – December 1987	Military governor
—	Joshua Madaki	December 1987 – August 1990	Military governor
—	Abu Ali	August 1990 – January 1992	Military governor
—	Dahiru Mohammed	January 1992 – November 1993	NRC
Rasheed Adisa Raji in Official Military Attire	Rasheed Adisa Raji	9 December 1993 – 14 September 1994	Military administrator
—	James Kalau	14 September 1994 – 22 August 1996	Military administrator
—	Theophilus Bamigboye	22 August 1996 – August 1998	Military administrator
—	Abdul Mshelia	August 1998 – May 1999	Military administrator
—	Ahmad Adamu Mu'azu	29 May 1999 – 29 May 2007	PDP
—	Isa Yuguda	29 May 2007 – 29 May 2015	ANPP
—	Isa Yuguda	29 May 2007 – 29 May 2015	PDP (Note: Yuguda defected to the PDP on 27 June 2009.)
Mohammed Abdullahi Abubakar	Mohammed Abdullahi Abubakar	29 May 2015 – 29 May 2019	APC
—	Bala Mohammed	29 May 2019 – Incumbent	PDP

== See also ==
- States of Nigeria
- List of state governors of Nigeria
