= Rasheed Adisa Raji =

Nigerian military governor

Captain Rasheed Adisa Raji
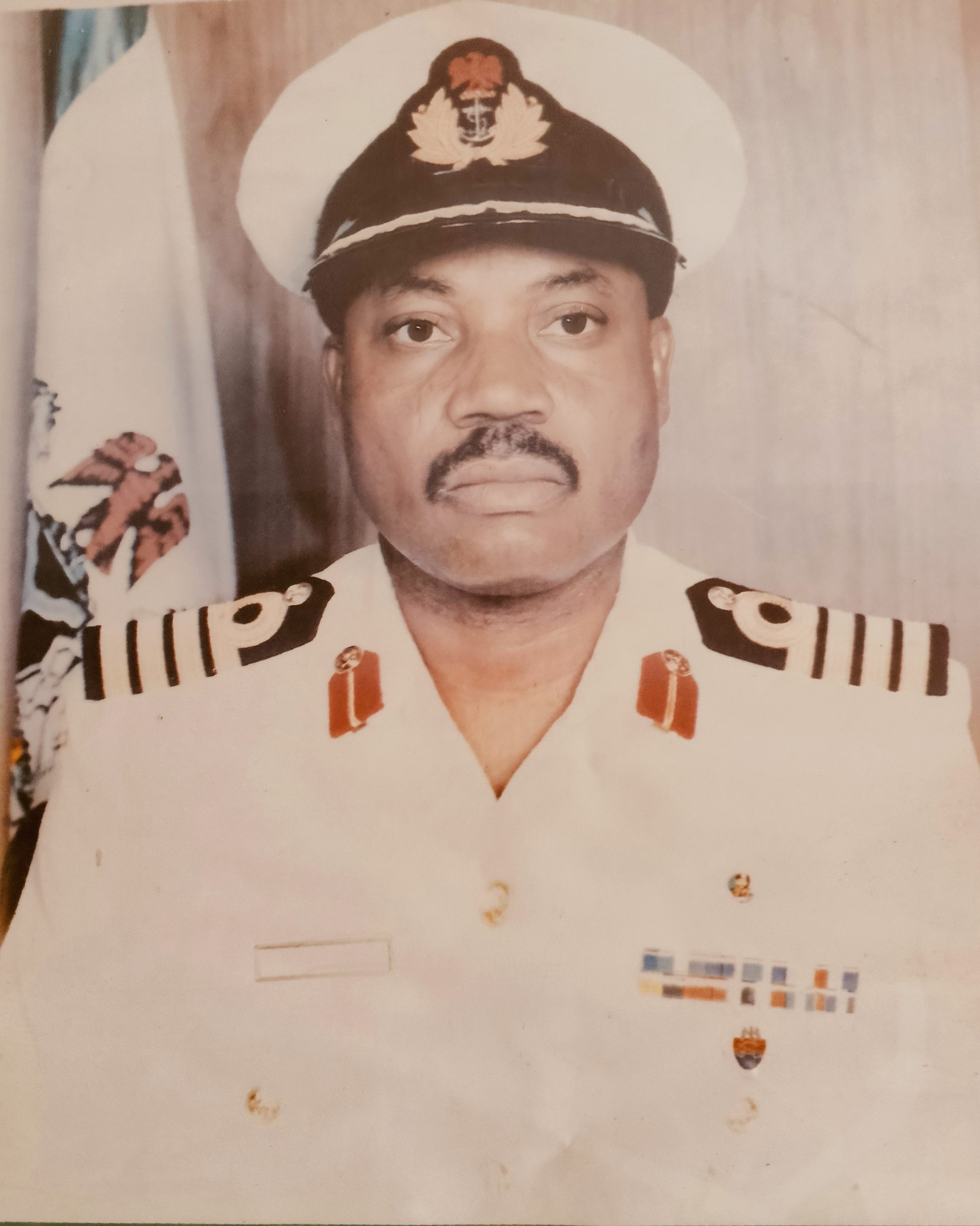

Military Administrator of Bauchi State
- In office 14 September 1994 – 22 August 1996
- Preceded by: James Kalau
- Succeeded by: Theophilus Bamigboye

Military Administrator of Sokoto State
- In office 22 August 1996 – August 1998
- Preceded by: Yakubu Mu'azu
- Succeeded by: Rufai Garba

Military service
- Allegiance: Nigeria
- Branch/service: Nigerian Navy
- Rank: Captain

Rasheed Adisa Raji was Military Administrator of Bauchi State in Nigeria from 14 September 1994 to 22 August 1996 and then of Sokoto State from 22 August 1996 to August 1998 during the military regime of General Sani Abacha.

Rasheed Adisa Raji was born in Abeokuta in Ogun State. As governor of Bauchi State, Raji's tenure was relatively uneventful. He enforced all government programs and policies, and supported traditional institutions. He initiated, built and commissioned the Legislative Quarters, now often called the "Raji Quarters".

On April 20, 1996, Alhaji Ibrahim Dasuki, the 18th Sultan of Sokoto, was officially deposed by the military government. As governor of Sokoto State in 1997, Raji assured his successor, Muhammadu Maccido, that "traditional rulers would always be given consideration in the scheme of things in view of their relevance in the administration of the state".

In September 1997 he officially commissioned the Women Centre for Continuing Education, Sokoto.

In September 2000, a commission investigating federal properties heard that Rasheed Raji was said to have converted a duplex belonging to the federal government in Ikoyi, Lagos into his personal property. He had demolished the building and rebuilt it as the old house was too small for him. In November 2000, Rasheed Raji declared for the ruling People's Democratic Party (PDP).
