= Muhammad Abu Ali =

Nigerian Army Officer (1980–2016)

Mohammed Abu Ali
- Born: 15 August 1980; Kogi State, Nigeria
- Died: 4 November 2016 (aged 36); Mallam Fatori, Abadam, Borno State, Nigeria
- Burial place: Military Center
- Military career
- Allegiance: Nigeria
- Branch: Nigerian Army
- Service years: 1998–2016
- Rank: Lieutenant Colonel
- Nicknames: BK killer, Giwan maza
- Unit: Maiduguri
- Commands: Army's 272 Tank Battalion
- Awards: UMNL; CON

Lieutenant Colonel Muhammad Abu Ali CON (15 August 1980 – 4 November 2016) was a Nigerian Army officer who commanded the Army's 272 Tank Battalion. He was a prince to the people of Bassa Nge in Kogi state. He was killed in an ambush by Boko Haram in Malam Fatori, Borno State.

== Early life and education ==
Ali graduated from Command Secondary School, Jos Plateau State Nigeria, in 1997 and was admitted to the Nigerian Defence Academy in 1998 as a member of the 50th Regular Course. He was commissioned as a 2nd Lieutenant into the Nigerian Army Armour Corps in September 2003. His father was Brigadier General Abu Ali, now the Etsu of Bassa-Nge Kingdom in Kogi State. His younger brother Lieutenant Abubakar Abu Ali is currently serving in the Nigerian Army.

== Career ==
He participated in the United Nations Mission in Liberia (UNMIL), United Missions in Darfur (UNMO), and received an accelerated promotion from the rank of Major to Lieutenant Colonel, receiving a gallantry award by the Chief of Army Staff, Lieutenant General Tukur Yusuf Buratai in September 2015.

=== Chief of Army Staff award for exceptional bravery ===
Ali received the Chief of Army Staff award in Gamboru for exceptional bravery from Lt Gen Tukur Yusuf Buratai on 9 September 2015, for his role in the fight against Boko Haram.

== Death ==
Ali along with six other soldiers were ambushed and killed by Boko Haram on 4 November 2016. He was buried on 7 November 2016, at the National Military Cemetery, Abuja.
