= Rukuba, Nigeria =

Rukuba Ungwan Rukuba
- District
- Location within Nigeria
- Coordinates: 09°56′N 08°54′E
- Country: Nigeria
- State: Plateau State
- LGA: Jos North

Government
- Elevation: 1,190 m (3,900 ft)
- Time zone: UTC+01:00 (WAT)
- Postal code: 930
- Climate: Aw

Rukuba (also Ungwan Rukuba) is a district in Jos North Local Government Area of Plateau State in the Middle Belt region of Nigeria. The postal code for the area is 930.

== People and language ==
The indigenous people of the area are the Bache people who speak Kuche, a Ninzic language.

== See also ==
- List of villages in Plateau State
