= Ogbadibo =

- LGA
- Interactive map of Ogbadibo
- Country: Nigeria
- State: Benue State
- Local Government Headquarters: Otukpa

Government
  - Local Government Chairman and the Head of the Local Government Council: Hon. Prince Samuel Odoh Onuh

Area
  - Total: 500.6 km^{2} (193.3 sq mi)

Population (2022)
  - Total: 189,100
  - Density: 377.7/km^{2} (978.4/sq mi)
- Time zone: UTC+1 (WAT)
- Postal code: 973

Ogbadibo is a Local Government Area of Benue State, North Central, Nigeria. It has three districts namely: Orokam, Owukpa, and Otukpa. The Local Government's headquarters is located in Otukpa Town.

It has an area of 598 km^{2} and a population of 128,707 as at the 2006 census.

== Prominent Nigerians from Ogbadibo ==
Former Minister of Agriculture and Rural Development Farmer Playwright Politician Audu Ogbeh Audu Ogbeh.

Chief Steven Lawani Former Deputy Governor of Benue State Politician Industrialist Steven Lawani Also, Honourable Ebenezer Ameh Odoh (OON), the First Idoma born to represent the Idoma North in the parliament.He was part of the Parliament in the First and Second Republic in Nigeria.

Major General Chris Abutu Garuba Soldier Former Governor of Bauchi State and Chief Military Observer United Nations Angola Verification Mission II Chris Abutu Garuba.

Former Minister of State for Education and novelist Jerry Agada.

Dr Paul Enenche, Senior Pastor of Dunamis International Gospel Centre.

== Postcode ==
The postal code of the area is 973.

== Climate ==
Ogbadibo has a tropical wet and dry climate, with rainfall concentrated between April and October and a dry season influenced by Harmattan winds. Temperatures remain warm year-round, usually between 22 °C (72 °F) and 34 °C (93 °F), and annual rainfall averages 1,200–1,600 mm (47–63 in).
