= Bauchi Radio Corporation =

Radio broadcast station in Nigeria

Bauchi Radio Corporation (BRC) is a broadcast station in Nigeria operated and owned by the Bauchi State Government. It is located on Ahmadu Bello Way in Bauchi, the capital of Bauchi State. The current managing director of the BRC is Alhaji Umar Muhammad Shira.

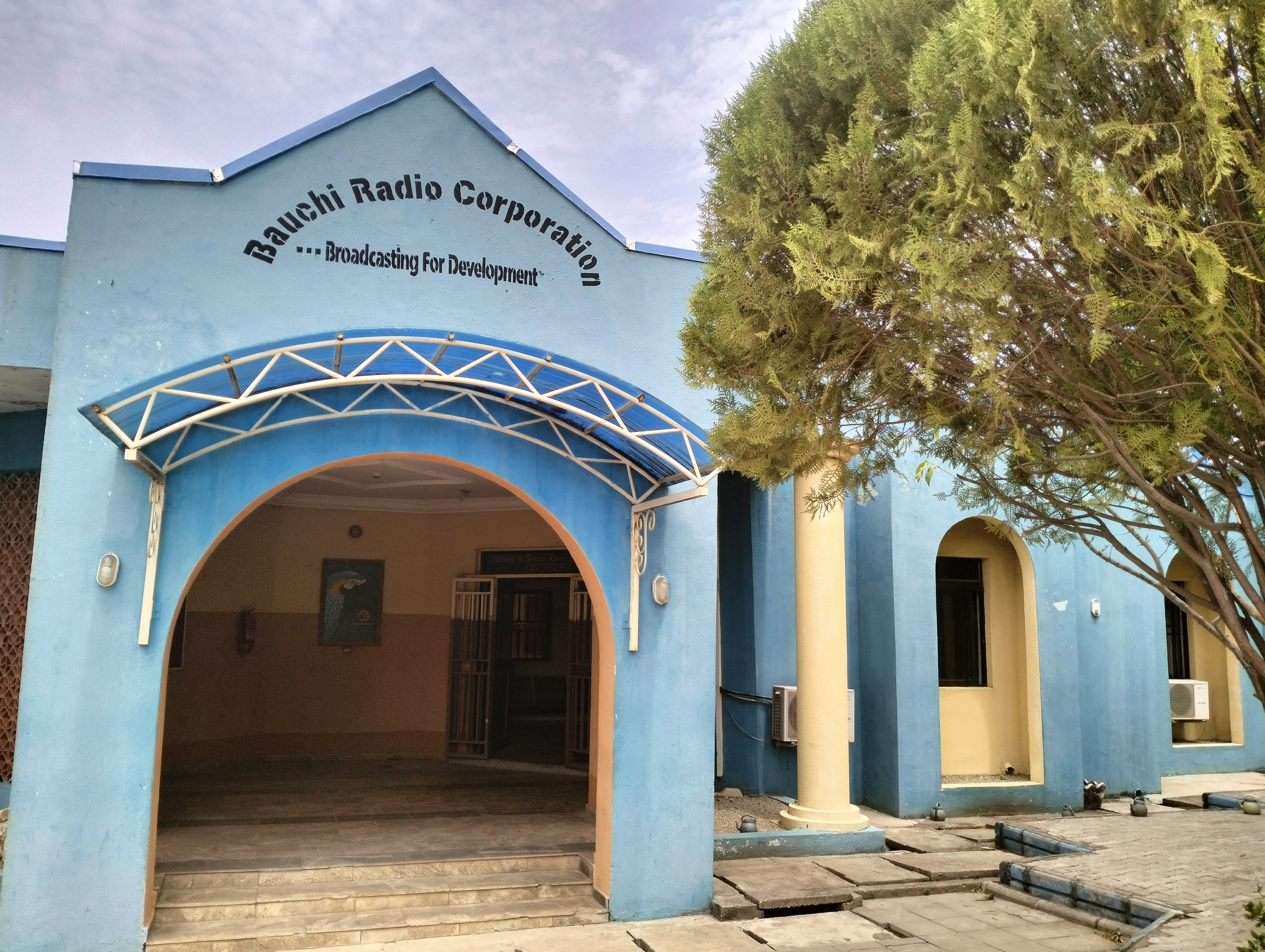
Bauchi Radio Corporation
