= Zaki Biam massacre =

Armed attack by the Nigerian military on the Tiv people in Benue State, Nigeria

Zaki-Biam massacre
- Location of Zaki-Biam in Nigeria
- Location: 7°30′2.16″N 9°36′22.68″E; Zaki-Biam, Benue State, Nigeria
- Date: 20–24 October 2001
- Target: Tiv people
- Attack type: Mass shooting, Mass killing, Spree killing, House demolition and Kidnapping
- Weapons: Machine guns, armoured tanks, helicopter gunship, grenades, whips and fire
- Deaths: Over 200
- Victims: Tiv people (civilians: men, women and children)
- Perpetrator: Nigerian Army
- Motive: Avenging the kidnapping and murder of 19 soldiers by suspected Tiv militia

The Zaki-Biam massacre (also known as The Zaki-Biam Invasion or Operation No Living Thing) was a mass execution of hundreds of unarmed Tiv civilians by the Nigerian Army between 20 and 24 October 2001. The massacre was a surreptitious operation of the Nigerian army to avenge the killing of 19 soldiers, whose mutilated bodies were found on 12 October 2001, near some Tiv villages in Benue State. The massacre took place in villages including Gbeji, Vaase, Anyiin, Iorja, Ugba, Tse-Adoor, Sankera, Kyado and Zaki-Biam.

At the time, the Nigerian Army and the federal government denied that soldiers killed any villagers. However, on 6 November 2007, the Chief of Army Staff, Lt. General Luka Yusuf, publicly offered an apology to the people of Benue State for the killings. President Umaru Yar'Adua also visited Benue State to personally apologize on behalf of the federal government of Nigeria. No soldier was ever punished, and nobody went to jail for the offences committed.

== Background to the killing of soldiers ==
On 10 October 2001, 19 soldiers were ambushed and captured in the town of Vaase by a group suspected to be Tiv militias. Two days later, the soldiers' bodies were discovered near a primary school in the nearby town of Zaki-Biam. According to locals, the murders were prompted by previous incidents in which armed men in military uniforms attacked several Tiv communities. There was a strong suspicion among the Tiv that elements of the military were backing their Jukun rivals, with whom they have had a reoccurring conflict over land, indigeneship, economic and political power.

There were suspicions that the 23rd armored brigade of the 3rd armored division of the Nigerian army, allied with the Jukun on directives of the minister of defence, Retired Lt. General Theophilus Danjuma, a Jukun man. In fact, a Wikileaks telegram cable dated 26 July 2007 emanating from Abuja said Retired Lt. General Victor Malu, a Tiv from Benue, accused Danjuma of leading the onslaught on Zaki-Biam. The deployment of this brigade to enforce peace in Taraba saw the troops waging war into Benue State. For instance, on 6 October 2001, the soldiers came to Kyado, a town 16 kilometres across the border into Benue State and attempted to abduct some men but were resisted. In concert with the Jukun, they razed down Tse Abanga, Ukpe, Toryem and Tse Hungwa villages in Benue State, killing and looting.

On 7 October 2001, another border town, Abako, in Benue State, was burnt down by youths dressed in army uniform. The attack came after a reconnaissance of the village by the army earlier in the day. Elsewhere in Plateau State on the same day, Jukun youths in army uniforms brought from Ibi to Yamini, by Sarkin Yamini and one Mallam Saba, a prominent member of the new Kwararafa Empire, profiled Tiv people in the market and killed them. This incident was condemned by the Chairman of Shendam local government, the Plateau State governor and Plateau elites.

On 8 October 2001, while the army was supposedly still actively keeping the peace in Taraba state, uniformed Jukun moved from house to house and slaughtered 35 Tiv civil servants, students and uncountable others and burnt Tiv houses in Ibi local government.

The suspicion of the army's alliance with the Jukun by the Tiv dates back to the 1992–1993 Jukun-Tiv conflict. During the conflict, the Tiv accused the army who were deployed to Wukari and Ibi local governments of disarming the Tiv while the Jukun were left with their arms, with which they invaded Tiv villages and killed at will.

In November 2000, soldiers from the 3rd Motorized Division of the Nigerian Army, Takum invaded the Tiv in Moon District, which the Abdulkareem Adisa Panel had excised to Taraba State in 1995. Being a 100% Tiv population, Taraba State rejected these people and handed them over to Benue State. Again, the Tiv accused soldiers drawn from the 4 Motorized battalion of the Nigerian army, Takum, the home of Lt. Gen. Danjuma, drafted to Kashimbila area of leading the attacks by the Jukun on them. The conflict which lasted more than three months saw many Tiv people killed. A prominent Tiv man and former cabinet minister, Paul Unongo, wrote a petition to President Olusegun Obasanjo.

=== Identity controversy ===
There were doubts that the victims were all soldiers. Many Tiv people held the opinion that some of the 19 killed were armed Jukun militiamen working in consonance with the military. They based their opinions on the facts that the victims were in private pickup trucks and not military vehicles and some of them were without official Nigerian army numbers. It was also reported in some sources that those abducted and killed were more than 25. Government response also gave credence to this view as they put forward varying numbers of soldiers killed in different official statements.

== The massacre ==
On 22 October 2001, the 19 soldiers said to have been killed, near Zaki Biam were given a state funeral in Abuja. At the funeral, President Olusegun Obasanjo said orders had been given out to the military to fish out those responsible. The killers had posed with the victims in photographs that were widely circulated in the media before killing them. Expectations were that it was not going to be a difficult job. However, while president Obasanjo, the minister of defense, Theophilus Danjuma, and the chief of army staff, Lt. Gen. Alexander Ogomudia, were all still at the funeral of the 19 soldiers, the army began its mass killing in Benue.

Soldiers who came from the 23rd armored brigade of the 3rd armored division of the Nigerian army raided seven towns; Zaki Biam, Tse Adoor, Vaase, Sankera, Anyiin, and Kyado. They ravaged each settlement they visited between 22 and 24 of October 2001. First, they attacked Gbeji, Vaase, and Anyiin on 22 October. On the second day, they killed many civilians and demolished Zaki Biam, Tse Adoor, Sankera and Kyado. On 24 October, they rounded off with a return to Zaki Biam, Tse Adoor, and Kyado. The soldiers, according to witnesses numbered between two and three hundred and rolled in armored tanks and military vehicles. For fear of being killed, locals deserted other villages on hearing news what had happened in other locations and the military on arrival destroyed such villages and looted freely. This was what happened at Anyiin where nobody was killed but properties were destroyed.

Weapons used by the army included machine guns and grenades. In Gbeji, 130 civilians were shot in the market square and then set ablaze. The village was razed. The town of Zaki Biam was leveled to the ground as well.

Comments by soldiers to locals indicated that the military operation was planned. A lot of witnesses narrated how soldiers blamed them (the Tiv people) for what was befalling them, for conspiring and killing their colleagues

The trigger of the massacres is said by some to be Obasanjo's statement at the burial of the 19 soldiers, giving soldiers a blank cheque to track and bring to books those responsible. While those responsible would have obviously been on the run, helpless villagers were brutally and summarily murdered in cold blood, and their properties and buildings decimated.

=== Gbeji and surrounding villages ===
The soldiers first visited in Gbeji on 19 October and returned on 22 October for the massacre. During their earlier visit, the sought to know the market day. On return, they rounded up people in the market square, separated men from women and children then opened fire. They smeared the bodies with fuel and set them ablaze. They moved into residential areas and riddled the houses with bullets before burning them. It was in Gbeji that a survivor recounted how he saw a soldier wearing a T-shirt with the inscription, "Operation No Living Thing", that he escaped.

The soldiers headed to Mgbakpa Yamsa and Tse Gube burning houses and valuables. As in Gbeji, they rounded up some people in Tse Gube and killed them.

=== Vaase ===
The attack on Vaase was brutal. When TMG visited it on 31 October, they described it as a ghost town. Soldiers were still on post there. Witnesses recounted that the military had asked some boys to invite people for meeting. As people converged, they asked one question: "Who killed the soldiers?" Then they asked them to queue up and on the sound of the commander's whistle, they opened fire. Some people, including a woman were taken alive and others, burnt in their houses.

=== Kyado ===
In Kyado, events differed. Yet, showed a distinction in the actions of the soldiers deployed to the area from Makurdi, the Benue State capital, and Wukari and Yola on the other hand. The residents of Kyado attributed the safety of lives in their village to the soldiers from Makurdi, who arrived just in time to deliver them from the brutality of the soldiers from Yola. The soldiers from Yola who first arrived Kyado on 19 October and lynched several people as well as burned buildings, returned again on the 23 and 24 October for the second leg of their mission, only to meet the soldiers from Makurdi, who negotiated the safe passage of Kyado residents. Notwithstanding, the soldiers from Yola destroyed and burned more houses before leaving.

Chief Orsar Tyowua, a 72-year-old Tiv leader of Kyado, was seized from his house before it was later burned. He was taken on 19 October 2001 by the soldiers. According to the testimony he gave to Amnesty International, he was taken to Taraba and interrogated. He was kept in a 9sqms cell, without light or ventilation alongside four others. He was made to frog-jump and kicked on the stomach severally. Locked up for a week, he was later released on the direct orders of the Taraba State governor.

=== Anyiin ===
In Anyiin, the soldiers arrived on 22 October. Nobody was killed. Only buildings and properties were destroyed. A witness counted three armored and eleven other military vehicles. A policeman was asked to watch and not intervene if he cared for his life.

=== Zaki Biam ===
In Zaki Biam, more than 30 people were killed. The operation lasted for two days, 23 to 24 October. The soldiers surrounded the biggest yam market in the world and as buyers and sellers panicked, they opened fire. They looted and destroyed stores and residential houses in the town. At least two Igbo traders were among those killed.

=== Tse Adoor ===
Tse Adoor, the village of the immediate past army chief, Victor Malu was also invaded. His family house was levelled amongst many others. Barns of yams were also burnt. Between 23 and 24 October, they killed at least 10 people including Malu's uncle, Pev Adoor, a blind octogenarian and his two wives, Kutser Pev, in her fifties, and Rebecca Doom Pev, in her sixties. Malu's mother was also tortured. A columnist with National Accord Newspaper, Emmanuel Yawe, who met Malu's mother before her death recounted the event. Soldiers told her they were sent kill to her and her son, General Malu. She told him "she responded that she was the mother of all Nigerian soldiers and she would be glad to die in the hands of her children."

=== Sankera ===
The attack on Sankera came on 23 October. Some people were killed, including a four-year-old boy, Tersen Tordue who was returning from farm on a motorcycle with a relative. They vandalized many houses and properties including a church, the local government chairman's house and the local government secretariat. Not less than 50 houses were burnt and a warehouse stocked with food kept for the internally displaced persons. They also carted away a huge amount of money belonging to Ukum local government.

== Victims ==
A wide range of estimates have been given for the numbers of civilians killed. Human Rights Watch concluded that the soldiers must certainly have killed tens of unarmed civilians and that figures of several hundred dead are entirely possible. Nnimmo Bassey, Executive Director of Environmental Rights Action, said nearly 2500 civilians were killed. The government initially put the death toll at 43, including eight soldiers. Over 14,000 people were directly affected. Hundreds of women and children were widowed and orphaned. At least one victim had his manhood chopped off while others lost their hands, legs or were severely burnt.

There was abuse of basic rights of the Tiv including many cases of rape, harassment, extortion, and looting. According to victims and witnesses, soldiers often insulted them on the basis of their being Tiv while mistreating them.

== Justice Okechukwu Opene Panel ==
Following recommendations from several civil society organizations, both local and international, President Olusegun Obasanjo, reluctantly, set up the Justice Okechukwu Opene Judicial Commission of Inquiry into inter-communal conflict in Benue, Nassarawa, Plateau and Taraba States. The panel submitted its report on 9 April 2003. However, the white paper of the report has never been made public. Many believe that the report may have portrayed the government in bad light.

== Court case and compensation controversy ==
Months after the massacre, a Tiv activist, Alexander Gaadi, led 13 other victims: Peter Orngu, Terfa Akaagba, Anongo Unishigh, Ngunengen Adura, Jabi Adula, Emelu Adula, Elizabeth Aoughakaa, Andrew Juntu, Azenda Igo, Anange Agashia, Mbakesen Ayatse, Mbayemen Masewuan, and Zaki Kaduna Mazan with a team of lawyers, including, Messrs Sabastine Hon, Ocha Ulegede and Chris Alashi sued the federal government of Nigeria at the Federal High Court, Enugu. They demanded 200 billion naira as compensation for the assault.

The case which was decided on 5 July 2007 by Justice Lewis Alagoa, awarded them the sum of 41.8 billion naira. The federal government appealed the case at the Court of Appeal, Enugu, but later, through its team of lawyers applied to settle the matter out of court. While negotiations were ongoing, the lead plaintiff, Alexander Gaadi, took ill and died.

Following Gaadi's death, the then Benue State Governor, Gabriel Suswam, reportedly initiated moves to receive the judgment debt. He negotiated with the federal government and agreed to receive a sum of 8 billion naira on behalf of victims of the massacre. The president directed that the money be paid through the Benue State Government.

However, lawyers to the plaintiffs wrote a petition to President Goodluck Jonathan, cautioning him to avoid paying twice since neither Governor Suswam nor the Benue State Government was a party to the case. They countered claims by the Attorney General for the Federation and Minister for Justice, Mohammed Bello Adoke, that Alexander Gaadi, the lead plaintiff gave a mandate to Governor Suswam to collect the Judgement debt. They stated that never was such a mandate brought before the various discussions held between the legal team and the government. The lawyers went further to accuse President Jonathan of bias for beating down the sum awarded to the Zaki Biam victims from 41.8 billion to 8 billion naira, while his kinsmen from Odi who were awarded a sum 37 billion naira by another court judgement, got a negotiated amount of 15 billion naira from the federal government. The lawyers argued that the Odi massacre involved just one community, in contrast to the massacre in Benue which affected four local government and several communities.

Prominent Nigerian lawyers like Itsay Sagay and Mike Ozekhome joined their voices in asking President Jonathan not to pay the restitution to the Benue State Governor, Gabriel Suswam.

It is not clear if the restitution was however paid to anyone.

However, a recent Judgement of the Legal Practitioners' Privileges Committee shows that the Federal Government of Nigeria paid the negotiated Judgement sum which was in billions and some Lawyers were sanctioned in the roles they played as many victims did not get paid.

== See also ==
- List of massacres in Nigeria
