= Abu Ali (military general) =

Nigerian military brigadier general and politician (1946–2025)

HRH Brigadier General Etsu Abu Ali Mopa III

Etsu Bassa Nge
- In office 2000–2025
- Preceded by: Abu Ali II

Governor of Bauchi State
- In office 4 September 1990 – January 1992
- Preceded by: Joshua Madaki
- Succeeded by: Dahiru Mohammed

Personal details
- Born: 1945 or 1946
- Died: 24 November 2025 (aged 79) Kogi State, Nigeria

Military service
- Allegiance: Nigeria
- Branch/service: Nigerian Army
- Rank: Brigadier General

Abu Ali (1945 or 1946 – 24 November 2025) was a Nigerian Army brigadier general. He was Governor of Bauchi State, Nigeria from August 1990 to July 1992, during the military regime of Major General Ibrahim Babangida and was the Etsu of Bassa Nge in Kogi State before his death, he was a complete Bassa Nge by tribe from Kpata. North Central Nigeria. He was a first-class title holder who was widely respected.

As governor of Bauchi State, he commissioned the Bauchi Township Water project, formed the Wikki Tourists Football Team, consolidated the Tomato Processing Company project and completed some hospital projects.

In 1991, there were riots in Tafawa Balewa, where Christians and Muslims disputed a shared abattoir. The trouble spread to Bauchi and other towns. After some delay, Abu Ali imposed a dusk-to-dawn curfew, banned all public gatherings and deployed police and soldiers in all troubled areas to keep the peace. In all, perhaps 1,000 people died.

Ali handed over to a democratically elected government in January 1992. He retired from the Nigerian Army in 1999 at the rank of a Brigadier General.

He was also the father of the late Lt. Colonel Muhammad Abu Ali who was killed by Boko Haram troops at Mallam Fatori, Borno State, Northeastern Nigeria and Lt. Abubakar Abu Ali who is currently serving in the Nigerian Army.

Ali died in Kogi State, Nigeria on 24 November 2025, at the age of 79.
