= David Bamigboye =

Nigerian politician and Military General

Brigadier general Femi David Bamigboye

Governor of Kwara State
- In office 28 May 1967 – July 1975
- Preceded by: Hassan Katsina (Northern Region)
- Succeeded by: Ibrahim Taiwo

Personal details
- Born: 7 December 1940 Omu-Aran, Kwara State, Nigeria
- Died: 21 September 2018 (aged 77)

Military service
- Allegiance: Nigeria
- Branch/service: Nigerian Army
- Rank: Brigadier general

Femi David Lasisi Bamigboye // (7 December 1940 – 21 September 2018) was a Nigerian military commander and politician of Kwara State from May 1967 to July 1975, after it had been split from the old Northern Region during the military regime of General Yakubu Gowon.

David Bamigboye is a member of the Igbomina ethnic group. His younger brother is Theophilus Bamigboye, another military ruler turned politician.

In 1968 he created the Kwara State Ministry of Education, with a department to handle Scholarship/Bursary matters. In 1971 he announced a decision to establish the Kwara State Polytechnic, which came into existence in 1972. In December 1972 he opened the new premises of Ola-Olu Hospital with accommodation for thirty-five beds.

In 1977, some properties he owned in Ilorin were seized, not to be returned until 26 years later in May 2003.

In 2009, his son, Femi David Bamigboye, was appointed special assistant to the Kwara State governor.

== Tenure ==
Bamigboye was the first military governor appointed to Kwara State in 1967. His administration benefited from a group of highly intelligent, experienced, and patriotic civil servants who were deployed to the newly created state. Working alongside the State Executive Council, Bamigboye oversaw a number of notable achievements during his tenure.

One of the administration’s major accomplishments was the construction of government secretariats in the state capital and in all local government headquarters, which provided office space for civil servants. The government also developed water works across the state to ensure access to clean drinking water for the population. Infrastructure improvements included the construction of the Oyo Bypass Road (now Ibrahim Taiwo Road) and other roads within the state. Additionally, the administration built the Kwara Hotels in Ilorin to promote hospitality and tourism.

In response to public demand for quality education, the administration established several government secondary schools and technical colleges. Communities and religious organisations were also encouraged to set up additional secondary schools. Major educational institutions founded during this period include the Kwara College of Technology (now Kwara State Polytechnic) and the School of Nursing and Midwifery, both located in Ilorin.

The Bamigboye administration also focused on improving healthcare delivery by building general hospitals in major towns and establishing healthcare centres in rural areas. To support economic development and state services, a number of government enterprises were founded. These included the Kwara State Printing and Publishing Corporation, the Government Printing Press, and the Gateway Insurance Company (established in 1970 to serve both Kwara State and the wider Nigerian market). Other institutions founded during this period include the Kwara State Investment Corporation, Kwara Paper Converters, Erin-Ile Midland Stores, and Nigerian Television (NTV), which later became NTA Ilorin.

Further initiatives included the establishment of the Kwara Food Production Company Ltd in 1973, known for producing Eagle Rice, among other products. The administration also founded the Kwara State Council for Arts and Culture on 1 September 1970 and the Kwara State Council in 1969.

== Awards ==
The Outstanding Leadership Award was conferred on Bamigboye by the Governor of Kwara State, Abdulfatah Ahmed, on 27 May 2017.
