= Shehu Kangiwa =

Nigerian politician

Muhammadu Shehu Kangiwa

Governor of Sokoto State
- In office October 1979 – November 1981
- Preceded by: Gado Nasko
- Succeeded by: Garba Nadama

Personal details
- Party: National Party of Nigeria

Alhaji Muhammadu Shehu Kangiwa was the first elected civilian governor of Sokoto State, Nigeria in the short-lived Nigerian Second Republic, holding office from October 1979 to November 1981. He represented the National Party of Nigeria (NPN). He was a popular governor, providing water, health care, agricultural input, education at all levels and transparent government.

The Bakolori irrigation project, started by the previous military government, had displaced many peasant farmers without providing land or compensation. Confronted by demonstrators in November 1979, Kangiwa promised to address all their grievances. However, on 28 April 1980 police moved in on unarmed demonstrators and shot dead over 380 people. The government played down the incident, claiming only 25 had died. He imprisoned Sheikh Zakzaky of the Islamic movement in Nigeria, along with some of his close disciples, and was said to have intended to execute him.

In 1981, he increased the number of Local Government Areas in the state from 19 to 32. However his successor Colonel Garba Duba reversed this measure in 1984.

He died in November 1981, falling from a horse while playing polo in the 1981 edition of the Georgian League. In 1982 Unisteel Ltd. presented The Shehu Kangiwa Cup in his memory, and the cup is now sponsored by Sokoto State Government.
