= National Military Cemetery, Abuja =

Coordinates: 9°01′31″N 7°25′39″E

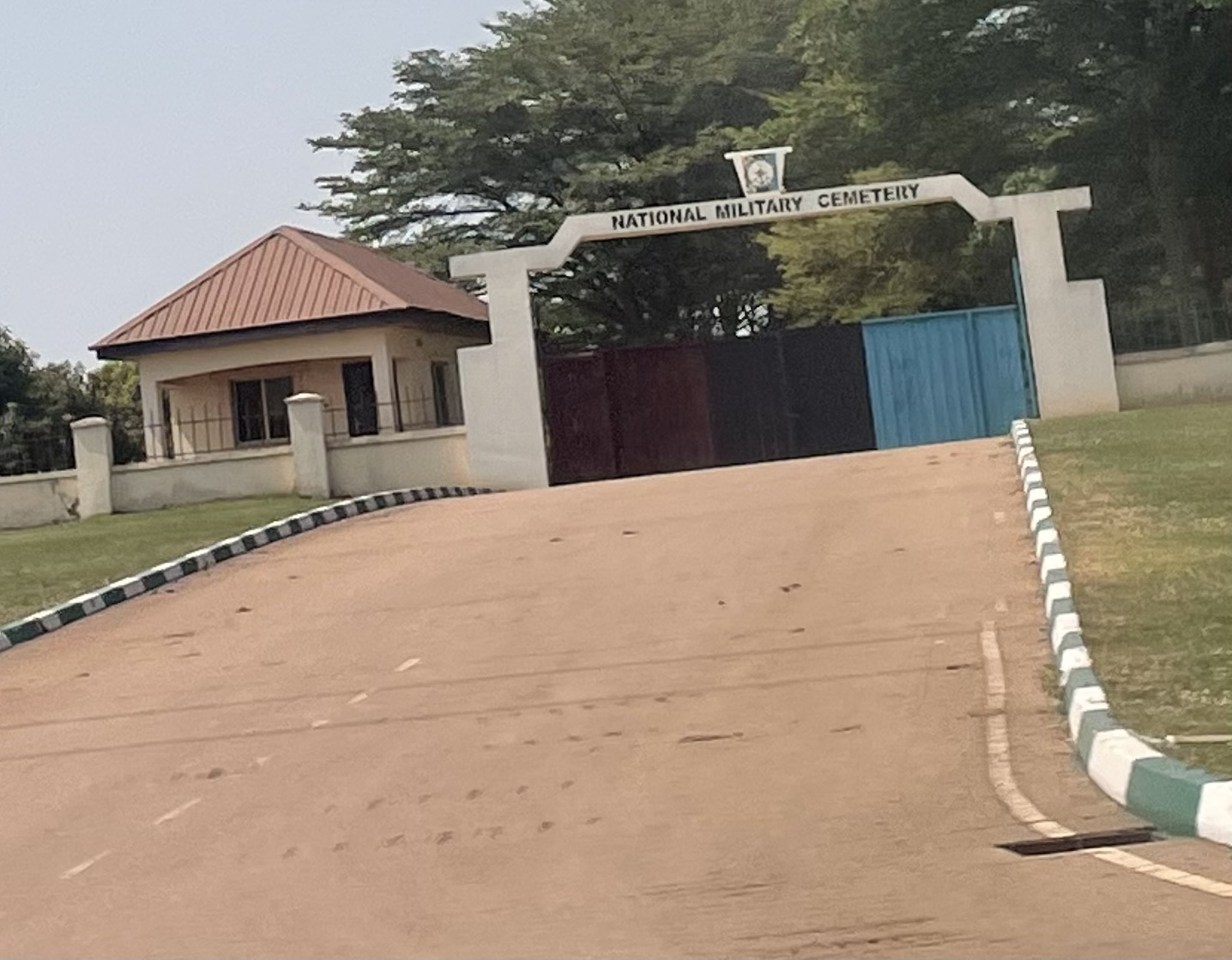
- Interactive map of National Military Cemetery, Abuja

The National Military Cemetery is the premier military burial ground in Nigeria, located in the country's capital, Abuja, within the Federal Capital Territory (FCT), it serves as the final resting place for members of the Nigerian Armed Forces. It is managed by the Veteran Affairs Division, Ministry of Defence.

== Abuja Memorial ==
The cemetery hosts the Abuja Memorial, maintained in collaboration with the Commonwealth War Graves Commission (CWGC). The monument honors Nigerian servicemen who fought and died for the British Empire during both World Wars of the 20th century. The forerunner to the monument was originally erected in Idumota, with a secondary structure, being built in 1962. Following the relocation of Nigeria's capital to Abuja, the Lagos monuments were dismantled. The modern memorial was completed inside the National Military Cemetery in February 2016 and dedicated in November.

== Ceremonies and events ==
The cemetery is part of the Armed Forces Remembrance Day held on January 15. It also hosts state funerals with military honors for high-profile casualties.

== Notable interments ==
- Ibrahim Attahiru (1966–2021), Lieutenant General and Chief of Army Staff
- Muhammad Abu Ali
