= Garba Nadama =

Nigerian politician (1938–2020)

Governor of Sokoto State
- In office January 1982 – December 1983
- Preceded by: Shehu Kangiwa
- Succeeded by: Garba Duba

Personal details
- Born: 1938
- Died: 4 May 2020 (aged 81–82)
- Party: National Party of Nigeria
- Education: Ahmadu Bello University (PhD)

Garba Nadama (11 November 1938 – 4 May 2020) was a Nigerian politician who was the second civilian governor of Sokoto State, Nigeria, in the short-lived Nigerian Second Republic, holding office from January 1982 to November 1983. He succeeded Shehu Kangiwa, who had died in a polo accident.

== Biography ==
Dr Garba Na-Dama (Magajin Garin Gusau) was born on 11 November 1938 in Gusau, Zamfara State, Nigeria. Apart from the conventional Islamic education, he received his early Western education from Gusau Elementary School and Sokoto Middle School in 1949 and 1953 respectively. From 1956 to 1960, he attended Bauchi Teachers College and Katsina Teachers College where he received his Grade III and Grade II Teachers certificates.

Upon completing his National Certificate in Education (N.C.E) at the Zaria Advanced Teachers College in 1966, Na-Dama in 1969 proceeded to Ahmadu Bello University, Zaria where he graduated with a B.A degree in history in 1972. He laterreturned to his alma mater where he pursued a Ph.D. in History which he completed in 1977. His thesis entitled ‘The Rise and Collapse of a Hausa State: A Social and Political History of Zamfara’ was the first authoritative work on the pre-colonial history of Zamfara.

During a long career, Na-Dama has served in several capacities in the areas of education and politics. From 1957 to 1961 he taught at Magajin Gari Ward School and Senior Primary School, Farfaru, Sokoto. Between 1963 and 1979, he served in many positions: the Head Master of Day Senior Primary School Samaru, Gusau, as Assistant Inspector of Education Examination, Northern Region, Kaduna, and as Principal of Sultan Abubakar College, Sokoto from 1967 to 1969. Na-Dama was the Provost College of Education, Sokoto from 1977 to 1979, Deputy Governor from 1979 to 1981, and Governor of Sokoto State from 1981 to 1983.

Na-Dama was a board member of the Northwestern Scholarship Board (1973–1976), Sokoto State History Bureau (1976–1977), Sokoto State College of Arts and Science (1977–1979), Constitutional Conference (1994–1995), National Reconciliation Commission (1995–1997), Board of Trustees PDP, Political Reform Conference (2005), Niger Delta Development Commission (2000–2007) and National Business and Technical Examination Board (2013–2015).Garba Nadama obtained a Ph.D. in history from Ahmadu Bello University in 1977.

Nadama was a fierce rival of Alhaji Ibrahim Gusau for the National Party of Nigeria (NPN) nomination for Sokoto deputy governor in 1979. He was described as a quiet, urbane and principled conservative politician. In July 1982, Sokoto State received a N96 million loan from the World Bank. In December 1982, the Federal government provided N400,000 to Sokoto State to use in reducing gully erosion. Nadama described the amount as meager and insufficient to handle the problem. On 8 March 1993, he commissioned a new transmitter for the Nigerian Television Authority in Gusau. The Federal Polytechnic, Kaura-Namoda (now in Zamfara State) was established during his tenure.

Nadama left office after the 1983 military coup in which Major General Muhammadu Buhari took power.

Nadama became a member of the National Political Reform Council, and later became a prominent member of People's Democratic Party (PDP). Nadama became a director of Societe Generale Bank Nigeria (SGBN). In April 2008, he was deputy National Secretary of a committee to review recommendations for resolving internal differences in the PDP. He was accorded with the revered traditional title of Magajin Garin Gusau by the then Emir of Gusau Alhaji Kabir Danbaba.

Nadama died on 4 May 2020 after a brief illness and is survived by four wives and eighteen children among are Professor Ahmed Rufai Nadama, Major General Kabiru Garba Nadama, Alhaji Mukhtar Nadama, Dr Mustapha Nadama, Hajiya Maryam Nadama, Hajiya Turai Nadama, Abubakar Nadama, Mansur Nadama and Abdulsalam Garba Nadama.
