= Otukpa =

Town in Nigeria

- Town
- Nickname: O.T Town
- Location in Nigeria
- Coordinates: 7°43′50″N 8°32′10″E
- Country: Nigeria
- State: Benue State
- Climate: Aw

Otukpa is a town in Benue State, Nigeria. It contains the headquarters of the Ogbadibo Local Government Area.

Otuba means to gather together. The name Otukpa is a symbol of Unity, Defence and Friendship.

Otukpa Language is an Idomoid language of Nigeria. It is considered a dialect of Idoma.

== Climate ==
In Otukpa, the rainy season is aggressive and overcast, the dry season is muggy and partly cloudy, and it is warm year round.

Year-round temperatures usually remain the same, with highs around 30 °C (86 °F), and lows around 20–22 °C (68–72 °F)

The rainy season typically goes from February to November, with the highest amount typically being in September, with around an 80% chance of rainfall per day.
