= Military governors in Nigeria =

A military governor was the head of a state during Nigeria's military era, appointed by the head of the federal military government to administer states, as established by Decree No. 14 of 1967. He exercised executive powers on behalf of the central military government. Administrators were usually appointed to rule a newly created state or when there was a political crisis or state of emergency.

== Johnson Aguiyi-Ironsi regime ==
General Johnson Aguiyi-Ironsi took power after a military coup on 16 January 1966, and was deposed in a counter-coup in July 1966 that brought General Yakubu Gowon to power. In May 1967, shortly before the start of the Nigerian Civil War, Gowon restructured the four regions into twelve states.

Region	Governor	Took office	Left office	Notes
Eastern Region	Lt. Colonel Chukwuemeka Odumegwu Ojukwu	19 January 1966	27 May 1967	
Mid-Western Region	Lt. Colonel David Ejoor	19 January 1966	August 1967	Continued as governor of Mid-Western State
Western Region	Lt. Colonel Fajuyi	19 January 1966	29 July 1966	Died during counter-coup of July 1966
	Lt. Colonel Robert Adeyinka Adebayo	4 August 1966	27 May 1967	
Northern Region	Lt. Colonel Hassan Usman Katsina	19 January 1966	27 May 1967	

== Yakubu Gowon regime ==
In May 1967 he reorganized the four regions in twelve states, appointing a military governor for each state. Gowon was deposed in a coup on 29 July 1975, replaced by General Murtala Muhammed.

== Murtala Muhammed regime ==
General Murtala Muhammed became head of state in Nigeria on 29 July 1975, when he assumed power after a coup that deposed General Yakubu Gowon. On assuming office, he replaced the military governors of the twelve states that had been appointed by his predecessor. On 13 February 1976 he was assassinated in an attempted coup, and replaced by General Olusegun Obasanjo, who replaced most of his appointees.

== Olusegun Obasanjo regime ==
General Olusegun Obasanjo became head of state in Nigeria on 14 February 1976 after the assassination of General Murtala Mohammed. He replaced or reassigned many of the state governors, and broke up some of the larger states into two or three new states. Obasanjo continued the transition to democracy with the Nigerian Second Republic, began under General Murtala Mohammed, allowing the election of civilian governors who replaced the military appointees in October 1979.

== Muhammadu Buhari regime ==
General Muhammadu Buhari became head of state after a coup d'état on 31 December 1983 which ended the Nigerian Second Republic. He was replaced by General Ibrahim Babangida in a coup d'état on 27 August 1985.

== Ibrahim Babangida regime ==
General Ibrahim Babangida became head of state after a coup on 27 August 1985, replacing General Muhammadu Buhari. In September 1987 Babangida created Akwa Ibom State from part of Cross River State and Katsina State from part of Kaduna State. In August 1991 he created eleven more states. He arranged for elections for states governors in 1991, with the military governors handing over to elected civilian governors in January 1992 at the start of the Nigerian Third Republic.

=== Governors of existing states ===
The list below gives governors of the states that were in existence when Babangida took power.

=== Administrators of new states ===
The newly created states in August 1991 were run by administrators rather than governors, a term used to reinforce the message that their tenure was interim until elected governors could take over.

In most cases, each new state was carved out of an existing state which retained its name but was now smaller in area. Exceptions were the old Gongola State which was split into Adamawa State and Taraba State, and Kogi State which was formed from parts of Benue State and Kwara State.

== Sani Abacha regime ==
General Sani Abacha became head of state in Nigeria after a coup in November 1993 that ended the Nigerian Third Republic. He dismissed the elected civilian governors and placed a military Administrator in charge of each state. In 1996 he created a number of new states: Ebonyi, Bayelsa, Nasarawa, Zamfara, Gombe and Ekiti. Abacha died in June 1998 and was succeeded by General Abdulsalami Abubakar, who transferred or replaced most of Abacha's appointees.

== Abdulsalami Abubakar regime ==
General Abdulsalami Abubakar became head of state in Nigeria on 9 June 1998 after the death of General Sani Abacha. Abubakar replaced or transferred the military administrators of most of the states, and instructed the new team to prepare for a smooth transition to democracy in May 1999. The elected president Olusegun Obasanjo required all former military administrators to retire from the military in June 1999.
