= Tatari Ali =

Governor of Bauchi State, Nigeria

Governor of Bauchi State
- In office October 1979 – December 1983
- Preceded by: Garba Duba
- Succeeded by: Mohammed Sani Sami

Personal details
- Born: c. 1929
- Died: 28 May 1993 (aged 64) United Kingdom
- Children: Bature Ali, Abubakar tatari Ali, Maikudi Binta Muhammed (late), Abba tatari (late), Babba tatari, Lami kazim Tatari, Ruma Tatari Ali, Hadiza tatari Ali, Musa Kalin tatari Ali, Nabila tatari Ali.(only known heir) edited by Ahmed Muhammed Dambam

Alhaji Abubakar Tatari Ali (c. 1929 – 28 May 1993) was a Nigerian politician who was elected Governor of Bauchi State in 1979, holding office until the military coup on 31 December 1983 that brought General Muhammadu Buhari to power.

In 1971, Ali was head of the Ministry of Information. He visited Washington, D.C., that year during preparations for planning the World Festival of Black Arts and Culture, to be held in Lagos in 1974.

Ali was elected in 1979 at the start of the Nigerian Second Republic on the platform of the National Party of Nigeria (NPN). His government was active in constructing roads, housing projects and industries, and opened 16 model farms across the state. He initiated and constructed the five-star Zarand Hotel. He created 43 local governments in the state, which were later abolished after the coup of 31 December 1993 that brought in a new military government.

Ali attempted to revive the Bauchi Meat Factory, establishing complementary outfits like the Gubi Dairy Farm, Madangala Sheep Ranch, Galambi Cattle Ranch and Gombe and Takko poultry farms. These enterprises, run by civil servants, were generally not profitable.

He also introduced a car loan scheme for mid-level and senior civil servants.

When the Buhari government took control, Ali was out of the country on pilgrimage. He traveled to the UK where he died of a heart complication. His body was brought back to Nigeria and buried in his home town of Zaki, according to Islamic rites.

Ali's health suffered from the harsh treatment he received in jail and he died shortly after being released.
