= Abdul Mshelia =

Abdul Adamu Mshelia

Administrator of Bauchi State
- In office August 1998 – 29 May 1999
- Preceded by: Theophilus Bamigboye
- Succeeded by: Adamu Mu'azu

Wing Commander (retired) Abdul Adamu Mshelia was Administrator of Bauchi State, Nigeria from August 1998 to May 1999 during the transitional regime of General Abdulsalami Abubakar. When he took over Bauchi only three of the 20 local government areas had electricity. Mshelia made few improvements during his brief term in office, but managed the elections for the first administration of the Nigerian Fourth Republic successfully, handing over to Alhaji Ahmadu Adamu Mu'azu on the 29 May 1999. In June 1999 Mshelia was required to retire, as were all former military administrators.
