= Garba Duba =

Nigerian politician (1942–2024)

Lieutenant General Garba Duba
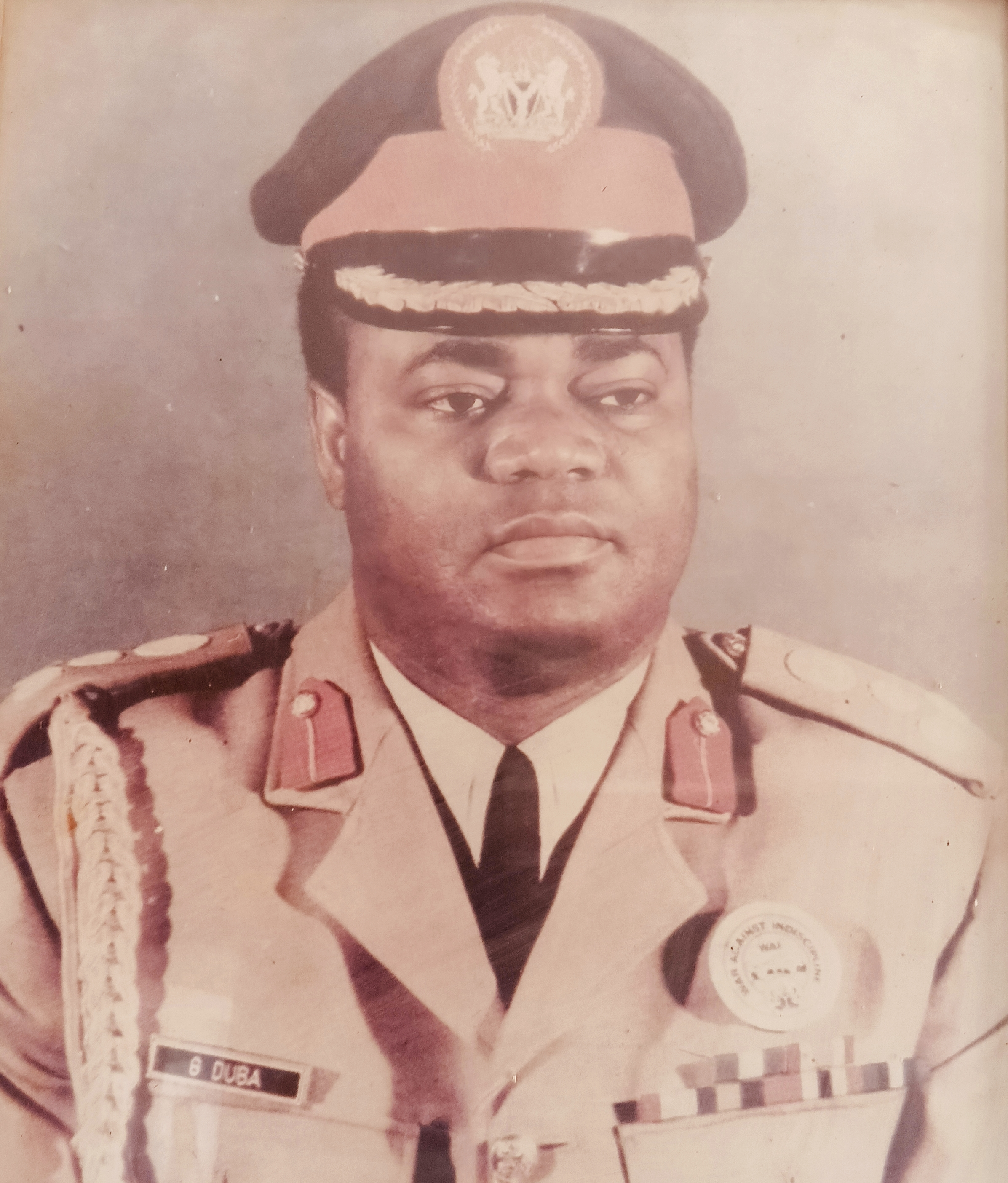

Governor of Bauchi State
- In office July 1978 – 1 October 1979
- Preceded by: Mohammed Kaliel
- Succeeded by: Tatari Ali

Governor of Sokoto State
- In office January 1984 – August 1985
- Preceded by: Garba Nadama
- Succeeded by: Garba Mohammed

Commandant of the Nigerian Defence Academy
- In office 1990 – February 1992
- Preceded by: Salihu Ibrahim
- Succeeded by: Aliyu Mohammed Gusau

Personal details
- Born: 1942
- Died: 17 May 2024 (aged 82)
- Education: Indian Military Academy

Military service
- Allegiance: Nigeria
- Branch/service: Nigerian Army
- Rank: Lieutenant General
- Commands: Commander, 2nd Mechanised Division (1987–1988); Commander, 3rd Armoured Division; Commandant, Nigerian Defence Academy (1990–1992)

Garba Duba (1942 – 17 May 2024) was a Nigerian Army Lieutenant General who was Governor of Bauchi State, Nigeria from July 1978 to October 1979 during the military regime of General Olusegun Obasanjo, and Administrator of Sokoto State from January 1984 to August 1985 during the military regime of Major General Muhammadu Buhari.

== Early career ==
Garba Duba was born in 1942. He was educated at Kontagora Primary School, Kaduna (1951–1954) and Provincial Secondary School, Bida, Niger State (1956–1962).

Duba joined the Nigerian Army as a Cadet Officer, entering the Nigerian Military Training College on 10 December 1962. One of his school classmates and army colleagues was Ibrahim Babangida, who married Duba's cousin Maryam in September 1969. Duba later attended the Indian Military Academy, and was appointed ADC to the Military Governor of the old Northern Region.

Duba was one of the northern officers who participated in the Nigerian counter-coup of 1966 which led to the murder of the head of state, General Johnson Aguiyi-Ironsi, and after which General Yakubu Gowon came to power. Others involved in the mutiny were Ibrahim Babangida and Sani Abacha, both to later become heads of State. As a captain, he served in the Nigerian Civil War (1967–1970), commanding a squadron of armoured vehicles.

== Governor of Bauchi State ==
Colonel Garba Duba was appointed Military Governor of Bauchi State in July 1978. He provided infrastructure in the form of residential accommodation and offices, including secretariats for the 16 Local Governments. Steyr Nigeria Limited, a tractor manufacturing company, was founded during his tenure. He established the Bauchi State Polytechnic, using one of the Teachers Colleges as premises. The rector was given Duba's brigade commander's guest house as his quarters, and army offices for administration. He expanded the number of Teacher Training Colleges and introduced Schools of Basic Studies on the site now used by the Abubakar Tafawa Balewa University. His administration supervised orderly elections for the Nigerian Second Republic in 1979, handing over to the elected governor Tatari Ali on 1 October 1979.

== Later career ==
Later he was appointed Military Administrator of Sokoto State (1984–1985). Other posts included Commanders of 2nd Mechanised Division (1987–88), Commander of 3rd Armoured Division and Commandant, Nigerian Defence Academy (1990–1992).

Duba retired in 1993, after thirty-one years of active military service. After retirement, he entered business, holding positions that included Chairman of the New Nigerian Development Company, Chairman of SGI Nigeria Limited, Director of First Bank of Nigeria, a non-executive director of Honeywell Flour Mills Plc as of August 1998, and chairman of the board of Leadway Pensure, a pension fund administration company.

== Death ==
Duba died on 17 May 2024 at the age of 82.
