= Bakolori Dam =

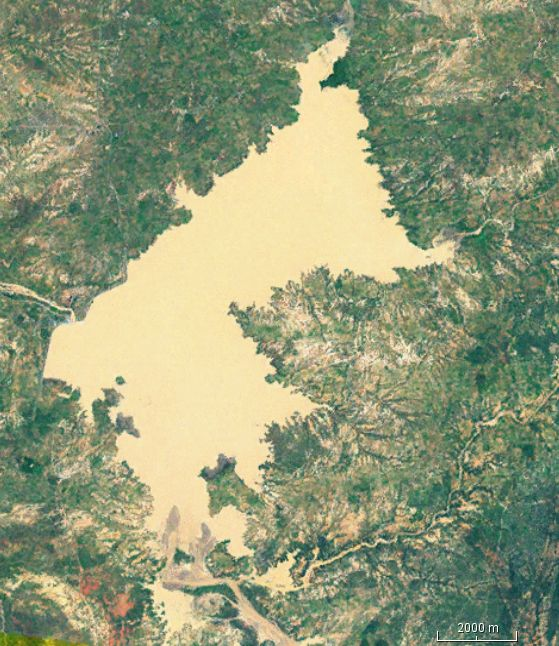

- Location within Nigeria
- Location: Nigeria
- Coordinates: 12°30′43″N 6°11′0″E
- Construction began: 1974
- Opening date: 1978

Dam and spillways
- Type of dam: Earth-fill embankment
- Impounds: Maradun
- Height: 48 m (157 ft)
- Length: 360 m (1,180 ft)

Reservoir
- Total capacity: 450,000,000 m^{3} (1.6×10^{10} cu ft)

Power Station
- Installed capacity: 11 MW

The Bakolori Dam is in Zamfara State in northwest Nigeria. It was completed in 1978 and its reservoir filled by 1981. It is a major reservoir on the Sokoto River, a tributary of the Rima River, which in turn feeds the Niger River. Water from the dam supplies the Bakolori Irrigation Project.

The dam has a capacity of 450 million cubic meters, with a reservoir covering 8,000 hectares extending 19 km (12 mi) upstream.

Dam construction displaced many peasant farmers without providing alternative land or financial compensation. Many people died in protests over their loss of livelihood. The project has become known as a classic example of development failure.

== Background ==
The Sokoto River runs through the semi-arid Sudan Savannah zone of northern Nigeria. Annual rainfall is unpredictable, ranging from 500 mm to 1,300 mm per year during the June–September period. Before construction of the dam, about 50,000 farmers in the Sokoto River floodplain practiced intensive recession farming, growing rice and sorghum in the wet season and vegetable crops such as onions, garlic and tomatoes in the dry season. Many farmers used the Shadoof practice of lifting water from the river to pour into irrigation channels or ponds. Women in purdah do not usually work the field but do have ownership rights and assist in processing. Women who are not under seclusion are active in farming. Often the land was owned communally without formal records of ownership.

Farmers in the area, living at subsistence levels, were more concerned with avoiding risk than maximizing profit. The area is subject to periodic droughts, and the desire for a stable water supply was one of the motives for constructing the dam.

== Planning ==
In 1969, the Food and Agriculture Organization (FAO) issued a report that recommended a small dam and irrigation scheme at Talata Mafara, with further upstream dams for flood control. The FAO report emphasized the importance of a gradual approach that would have minimal impact on existing land use patterns, in part because of lack of experience with irrigation projects in the region. In 1971 the Nigerian military government invited proposals for design and supervision of the project and, in 1972, awarded the job to Impressit Bakolori Nigeria, a company owned 60% by the Nigerian government and 40% by a subsidiary of Fiat. During the 1972 to 1974 study period, the scope of the project expanded to cover a single large dam and a large-scale mechanized irrigation scheme. Local farmers were not consulted in the planning process and no study was made of the downstream impact.

== Construction ==
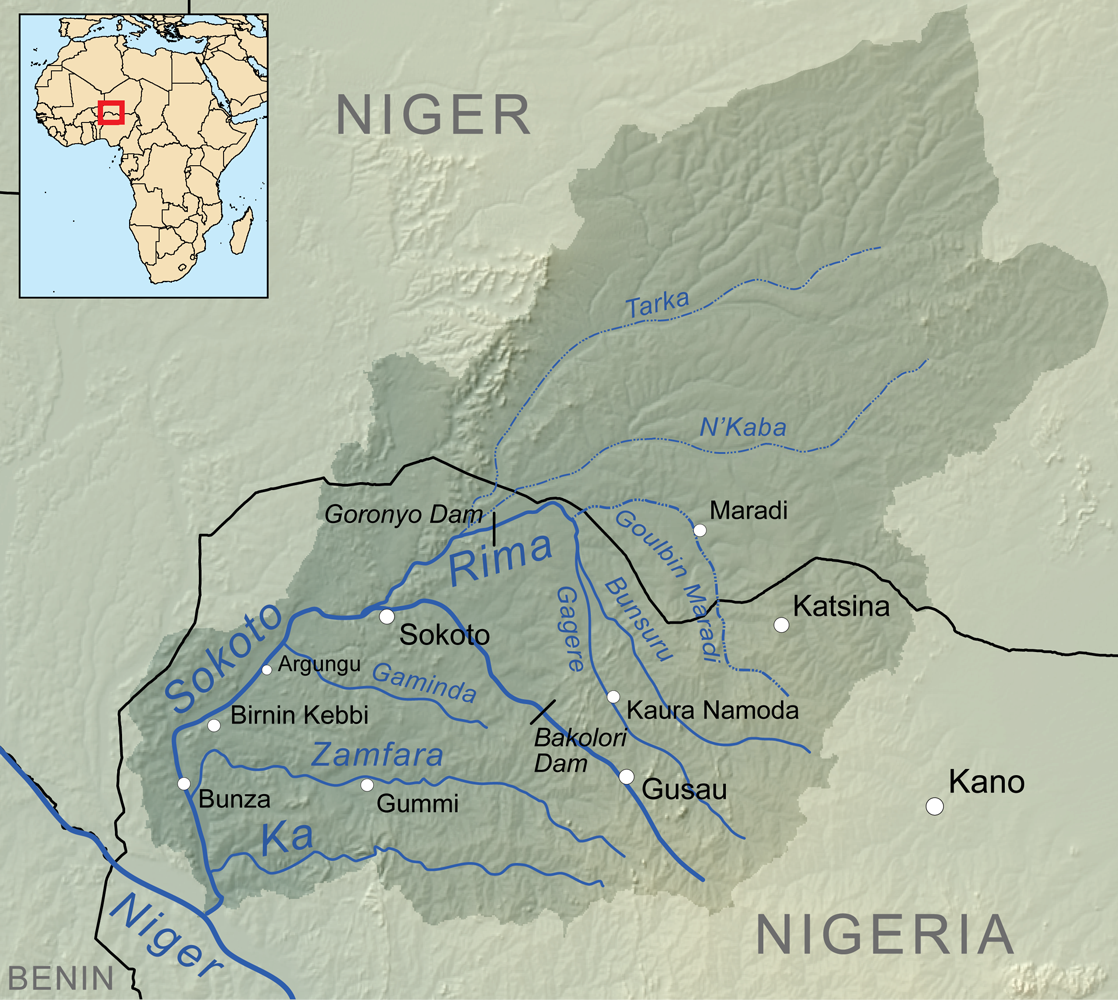
Sokoto River Basin, showing the location of the dam

Construction of the dam began in 1974 and was completed in 1978, after which it took three years for the reservoir to fill. The dam is a 5.5 km (3 mi) earth-fill embankment, with a central concrete structure 360 m long and 48 m high incorporating a small 3 MW hydroelectric power plant. The irrigation pipes and canals were not completed until 1983 and covered only 23,000 hectares compared to 30,000 hectares originally planned. Water was delivered to 15,000 hectares by sprinklers and to 8,000 hectares by gravity. Sprinklers are expensive but make more efficient use of water if well maintained. After cost overruns, the irrigation project ended up as one of the most expensive per hectare in the world.

Construction of the dam, with land leveling, clearing and canal construction destroyed valuable farmland and trees. The local farmers became landless peasants. Most received no compensation, or were given worthless land. Those that stayed were forced to grow unfamiliar crops such as wheat. During construction, the local farmers were deprived of the means to make a living for several years. Confronted by demonstrators in November 1979, the governor of Sokoto State, Shehu Kangiwa, promised to address all their grievances. However, on 28 April 1980 police moved in on unarmed demonstrators and killed over 380 people. The government played down the incident, claiming only 25 had died.

== Downstream impact ==
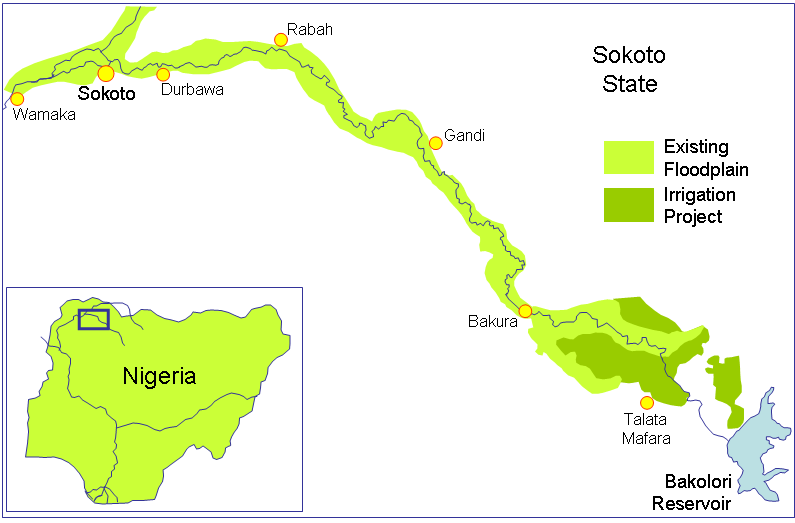
Sketch map of Sokoto River showing Bakolori Dam and irrigation project

The downstream floodplain farmers required large-scale water release before the growing season, with diminished flows later as they practiced flood recession agriculture. Dam operators were not sensitive to this need, releasing insufficient water at inappropriate times. The dam significantly decreased peak flows and the depth, duration and extent of flooding downstream during the wet season. It also reduced the total amount of water available for farming, since a large sheet of water in a hot and arid area loses much to evaporation. In the downstream areas, of a total of 19,000 hectares of floodplain land, the dam resulted in loss of 7,000 hectares of rice production and 5,000 hectares of dry season crops. This loss was partially offset by increases in lower-value millet and sorghum production, but 12,000 people were forced to move. The loss of agricultural output has been valued at US$7 million annually.

== Reservoir and irrigation area ==
The reservoir has a relatively small littoral area, which limits the size of spawning and nursery areas of most fish species. The water is turbid, holding suspended soil particles that block the light and inhibit growth of submerged aquatic plants on which fish depend for food. This limits the capacity of the reservoir for fish production. The reservoir is less productive than the river and the river's natural lakes and pools. In the irrigated area, the higher water table combined with high evaporation rates has caused salinization, which has already ruined half of the irrigable land. There were also higher levels of water-born diseases. Attempts to introduce new varieties of cowpea inter-cropped with millet, sorghum and groundnuts had little success due to the relatively low yield of this traditional crop and the high cost of the irrigation systems.

By 2003, the sprinkler system was no longer operational and only 7,500 hectares were being cultivated, mostly for rice, using gravity-fed irrigation. Land was left untilled. Many residents drifted away to the cities. The Bakolori Dam resulted in a 53% decrease in the usable cropped area.

The authors of a report on Wise Use of Wetlands published by UNESCO in 1988 concluded that "a more complete economic appraisal of the scheme at Bakolori would have been less favourable than the calculation upon which it was approved."
