= Kebbi =

Kebbi may refer to:

- Kebbi State, a region in Nigeria
- Kebbi attack, various attacks in Kebbi, Nigeria
- Kebbi kidnapping, in June 2021
- Kebbi State University of Science and Technology
- Kebbi boat disaster, in 2021
- Kebbi Emirate, a traditional state in what is now Nigeria

== See also ==
- Kebbie
