= Kebbi attack =

Kebbi attack may refer to:

- 2021 Kebbi massacre, in June 2021
- 2021 Kebbi kidnapping, in June 2021
- 2025 Kebbi kidnapping, in November 2025
- Dankade massacre, in January 2022
- March 2022 Kebbi massacres, in March 2022
