= Dakarkari people =

Ethnic group in Nigeria

Dakarkari people, also known as Lelna or Dakkarawa, are one of the ethnic groups in Nigeria, with an approximate population of 136,000. They are mainly found in Zuru, Donko-Wasagu, and Sakaba Local Government Areas of Kebbi State (formally part of Sokoto State) and some other local governments in Niger State like Rijau and Mariga. They are divided into different sub-groups which are Bangawa, Kafawa, Kelawa, and Lilawa. Today, they can be found in Kebu, Roma, Dogo, Isgogo, Dabai, Rikoto, Peni, Zuru, Manga, Senchi, Ushe, Tadurga, Diri, Ribah, Conoko and Rade.

== Origin ==
The Dakarkari people originated from Kebbi kingdom up till the eighteenth century. The Dakarkaris were the foot soldiers of the kingdom from which their name was derived: daakaaree which means infantryman in Hausa language. However, after the fall of Kebbi Kingdom they moved further south where they could farm undisturbed.

== Marriage tradition ==
The marriage tradition of the Dakarkari people is a distinct tradition in the Northern part of the country. No other tribe has a similar marriage tradition. In the tradition, a man must be initiated into Golmo at U'hola annual festival before he can marry. Whoever is not initiated is not considered as a responsible person and cannot be given wife. Also, it is expected of the future son in law to work on the farm of his father-in-law-to-be for a period of seven years with reference to what Moses did in the Bible.

== Military recognition ==
The Dakarkari people are mainly found in the Nigeria Military Force. This is associated with their courage and braveness that have been learnt during the initiation in Golmol culture.

== Festival ==
The U'hola Festival is an annual festival that is used to commemorate the favour of their God on their harvest. It is also used to celebrate the graduation of suitors (Yadato) who have served their respective father in-laws in (Golmo).
