= Kamuku =

Kamuku may refer to:

- Kamuku people, an ethnic group in central Nigeria
- Kamuku language, spoken by them
  - Kamuku languages, a group of languages related to Kamuku
- Kamuku National Park, a national park in Nigeria
