= Kagare language =

Kainji language spoken in Nigeria

Kagare
- Kwagere
- Native to: Nigeria
- Region: Niger State
- Ethnicity: Kamuku people
- Language family: Niger–Congo?: Atlantic–Congo; Benue–Congo; Kainji; Kamuku; Kagare

Language codes
- ISO 639-3: –

Kagare (Kwagere) is a Kainji language of Nigeria belonging to the Kamuku language complex. There is partial intelligibility with Cinda, Regi and Səgəmuk (Zubazuba). Kagare is reported by Blench, but is not in Ethnologue or Glottolog.
