= 2022 Kebbi massacres =

2022 Kebbi massacres may refer to:

- Dankade massacre, a January 2022 massacre in Kebbi State, Nigeria
- March 2022 Kebbi massacres
