= March 2022 Kebbi massacres =

Mass shootings in Nigeria

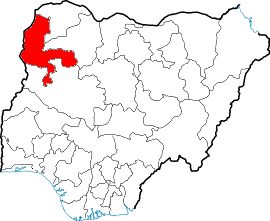
- Location: Kebbi State
- Date: 8 March 2022; 4:30pm
- Attack type: mass shooting
- Deaths: 81+
- Injuries: 8+
- Perpetrator: Gangs VNSA

On 8 March 2022, bandit gangs carried out two mass shootings in Kebbi State, northwest Nigeria, killing over 80 people.

== Background ==
The Nigerian bandit conflict began in 2011. It takes place in northwest Nigeria, between armed gangs and the government, who, after a decade, designated the gangs terrorist groups. The VNSA gangs often carry out attacks against the government and civilians, including mass shootings and mass kidnappings. The gangs' most deadly attack was the 2022 Zamfara massacres. Their attacks in Kebbi State have included a massacre and a mass kidnapping, both in June 2021, as well as a massacre in January 2022.

== Shootings ==
On 8 March 2022, in Sakaba, bandits ambushed and killed at least 62 members of volunteer vigilante group Yan Sa Kai in Kebbi.

At around 4:30pm on the same day, a horde of bandits entered a riverside settlement near Kanya, Wasagu/Danko. They left their motorcycles behind and surrounded Kanya. The attackers entered Kanya and ambushed the deputy governor's convoy, killing thirteen soldiers, five policemen and a vigilante. Eight other people were wounded.

== Reaction ==
The killings were condemned by president Muhammadu Buhari.
