= Acipa language =

Acipa (Achipa) may be either of two languages which are related, though not more closely than they are to each other:

- Western Acipa language
- Eastern Acipa language
