= 2003 Nigerian Senate elections in Kebbi State =

2003 Nigerian Senate election in Kebbi State

The 2003 Nigerian Senate election in Kebbi State was held on April 12, 2003, to elect members of the Nigerian Senate to represent Kebbi State. Sani Kamba representing Kebbi North, Farouk Bello Bunza representing Kebbi Central and Usman Sanni Sami representing Kebbi South all won on the platform of the All Nigeria Peoples Party.

== Overview ==
Affiliation	Party		Total
Affiliation	PDP	ANPP	Total
Before Election			3
After Election	0	3	3

== Summary ==
District	Incumbent	Party	Elected Senator	Party
Kebbi North			Sani Kamba	ANPP
Kebbi Central			Farouk Bello Bunza	ANPP
Kebbi South			Usman Sanni Sami	ANPP

== Results ==
=== Kebbi North ===
The election was won by Sani Kamba of the All Nigeria Peoples Party.

2003 Nigerian Senate election in Kebbi State
Party	Candidate	Votes	%
ANPP	Sani Kamba		
Total votes			
ANPP hold			

=== Kebbi Central ===
The election was won by Farouk Bello Bunza of the All Nigeria Peoples Party.

2003 Nigerian Senate election in Kebbi State
Party	Candidate	Votes	%
ANPP	Farouk Bello Bunza		
Total votes			
ANPP hold			

=== Kebbi South ===
The election was won by Usman Sanni Sami of the All Nigeria Peoples Party.

2003 Nigerian Senate election in Kebbi State
Party	Candidate	Votes	%
ANPP	Usman Sanni Sami		
Total votes			
ANPP hold			
