= Rubaruba language =

Kainji language of Nigeria

Rubaruba
- Native to: Nigeria
- Region: Niger State
- Ethnicity: Kamuku people
- Language family: Niger–Congo?: Atlantic–Congo; Benue–Congo; Kainji; Kamuku; Rubaruba

Language codes
- ISO 639-3: –

Rubaruba (tuRubaruba) is a Kainji language of Nigeria belonging to the Kamuku language complex. Rubaruba is reported by Blench (2012), but is not covered in Ethnologue or Glottolog.
