= Rogo language =

Kainji language of Nigeria

Rogo
- Native to: Nigeria
- Region: Niger State
- Language family: Niger–Congo?: Atlantic–Congo; Benue–Congo; Kainji; Kamuku; Rogo

Language codes
- ISO 639-3: rod
- Glottolog: rogo1238

- Person: bɔRɔgo
- People: oRogo
- Language: tòRógó
- Country: Rogo, Rɔgɔ

Rogo (also Urogo, Burogo, Ucanja Kamuku) is a Kainji language of Nigeria. It is spoken around the town of Ucanja in the Rafi and Mariga Local Government Areas of Niger State, as well as the Birnin Gwari LGA of neighbouring Kaduna State.

The name Rogo can refer to two language varieties, namely a Cinda-Regi variety and another non-Cinda-Regi variety.
