= 2015 Nigerian Senate elections in Kebbi State =

2015 Nigerian Senate election in Kebbi State

The 2015 Nigerian Senate election in Kebbi State was held on March 28, 2015, to elect members of the Nigerian Senate to represent Kebbi State. Yahaya Abubakar Abdullahi representing Kebbi North, Adamu Aliero representing Kebbi Central and Bala Na'Allah representing Kebbi South all won on the platform of All Progressives Congress.

== Overview ==
Affiliation	Party		Total
Affiliation	APC	PDP	Total
Before Election			3
After Election	3	–	3

== Summary ==
District	Incumbent	Party	Elected Senator	Party
Kebbi North			Yahaya Abubakar Abdullahi	APC
Kebbi Central			Adamu Aliero	APC
Kebbi South			Bala Na'Allah	APC

== Results ==
=== Kebbi North ===
All Progressives Congress candidate Yahaya Abubakar Abdullahi won the election, defeating People's Democratic Party candidate Usman Saidu Nasamu Dakingari and other party candidates.

2015 Nigerian Senate election in Kebbi State
Party	Candidate	Votes	%
APC	Yahaya Abubakar Abdullahi		
PDP	Usman Saidu Nasamu Dakingari		
Total votes			
APC hold			

=== Kebbi Central ===
All Progressives Congress candidate Adamu Aliero won the election, defeating People's Democratic Party candidate Abubakar Malam and other party candidates.

2015 Nigerian Senate election in Kebbi State
Party	Candidate	Votes	%
APC	Adamu Aliero		
PDP	Abubakar Malam		
Total votes			
APC hold			

=== Kebbi South ===
All Progressives Congress candidate Bala Na'Allah won the election, defeating People's Democratic Party candidate Abubakar Sadiq and other party candidates.

2015 Nigerian Senate election in Kebbi State
Party	Candidate	Votes	%
APC	Bala Na'Allah		
PDP	Abubakar Sadiq		
Total votes			
APC hold			
