= Katsina State House of Assembly =

Legislative arm of the government of Katsina State of Nigeria

The Katsina State House of Assembly is the legislative arm of the government of Katsina State of Nigeria. It is a unicameral legislature with 34 members elected from the 34 local government areas of the state.

== Legislation ==
From 2023 to 2025, the assembly enacted 40 laws.

== See also ==
- Houses of assembly of Nigerian states
