= Adamu Augie College of Education =

Nigeria college of education

- Type: Public
- Established: 1993
- Provost: Abubakar Abubakar Birnin Kebbi
- Location: Argungu, Kebbi State, Nigeria; 12.698°N 4.513°E
- Location within Nigeria

The Adamu Augie College of Education is a state government higher education institution located in Argungu, Kebbi State, Nigeria. The current acting Provost is Abubakar Abubakar Birnin Kebbi.

== History ==
The Adamu Augie College of Education was established in 1993.

== Courses ==
The institution offers the following courses;

- Hausa
- Home Economics
- History
- Arabic
- Mathematics
- English
- Geography
