= 2025 Kebbi kidnapping =

On 17 November 2025, gunmen stormed the government girls comprehensive secondary school in Maga town, Wasagu/Danko local government, Kebbi State, Nigeria. The assailants killed the vice principal, injured one teacher and abducted 25 schoolgirls from their hostel.

== Background ==
In November 2025, bandits invaded a boarding school in Maga around 4:00am opened fire, and killed at least one teacher, then abducted almost 25 schoolgirls from their hostel.

== Aftermath ==
Two days after the abduction, two of the girls were returned safely one escaped from the abductors, while the other one who was initially feared abducted later reappeared. this left parents and relatives in deep sorrow, crying for the safe return of their children.

=== Rumors ===
Rumours were desseminated that the abductees are Christians, however the chairman of Danko-Wasagu local government clarified that the girls are Muslims and publicly released their names.

=== Release ===
On 25 November, the remaining 24 girls were released and handed over to their families by the Kebbi State government.
