= Houses of assembly of Nigerian states =

State legislatures

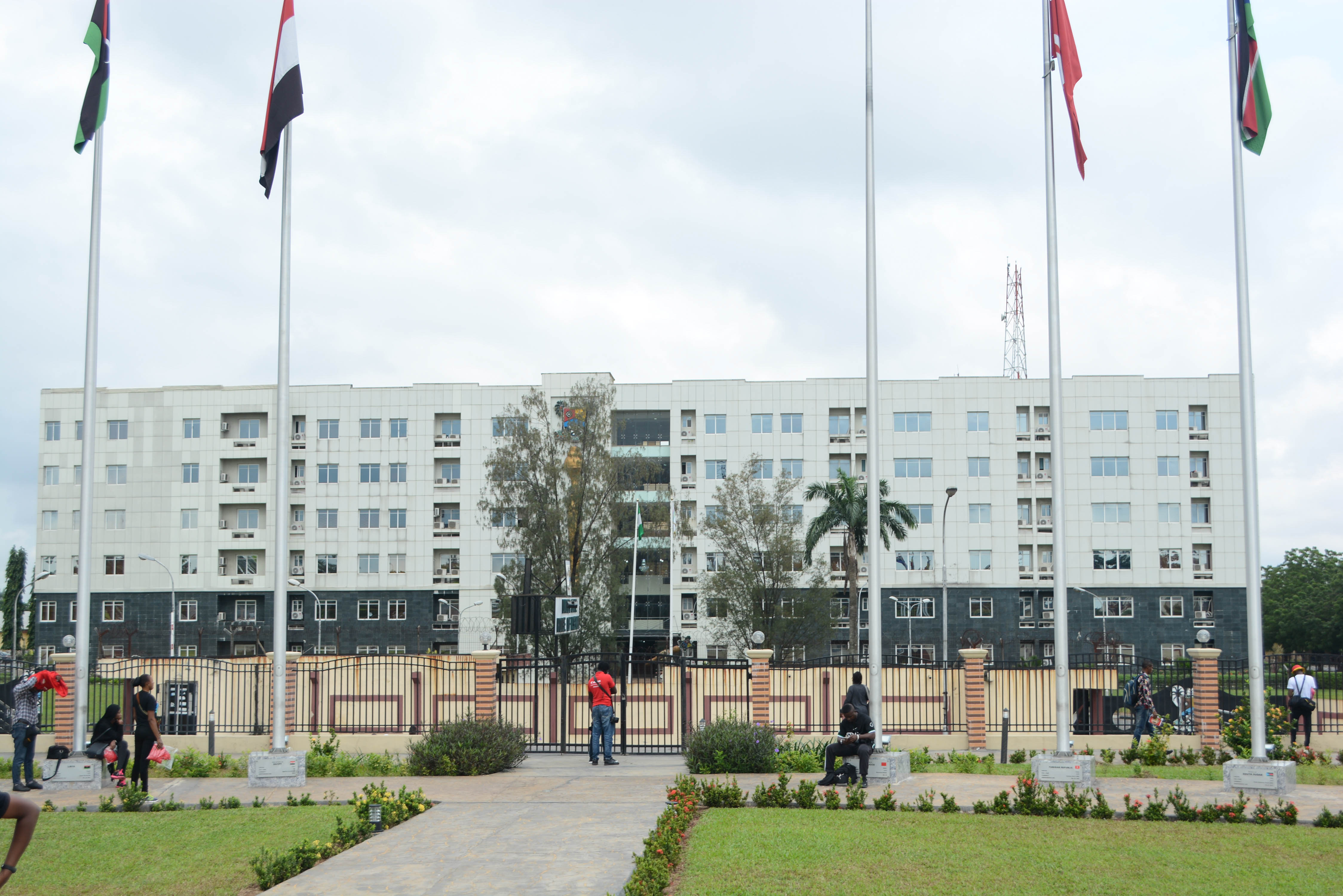
Lagos State House of Assembly Complex, Alausa, Ikeja, Lagos State.

In Nigeria, a House of Assembly is the state-level legislature. All Houses of Assembly are unicameral, with elected members who are designated as members of the House of Assembly, assemblymen, or MHA, and who serve four-year terms.

In the Federal Capital Territory, which is not a state, there is no territory-wide legislature analogous to a State House of Assembly, with its second highest level of government being the federally-appointed Federal Capital Territory Administration and its second highest level of elected government being its six area councils.

== State legislatures ==
| Name | City | Seats | Composition (as of) | Website |
|---|---|---|---|---|
| Abia State House of Assembly | Umuahia | 24 | 18 PDP; 3 APC; 2 LP; 1 APGA (as of July 2022) | abiastate.gov.ng/legislature |
| Adamawa State House of Assembly | Yola | 25 | 14 PDP; 10 APC; 1 NNPP (as of 5 June 2022) | N/A |
| Akwa Ibom State House of Assembly | Uyo | 26 | 24 PDP; 2 YPP (as of July 2022) | akshouseofassembly.com |
| Anambra State House of Assembly | Awka | 30 | 17 APGA; 7 PDP; 5 APC; 1 Vacant (as of 21 May 2022) | N/A |
| Bauchi State House of Assembly | Bauchi | 31 | 16 APC; 15 PDP (as of 17 April 2022) | N/A |
| Bayelsa State House of Assembly | Yenagoa | 24 | 20 PDP; 4 APC (as of 15 April 2021) | N/A |
| Benue State House of Assembly | Makurdi | 30 | 24 PDP; 5 APC; 1 ADC (as of 27 October 2021) | N/A |
| Borno State House of Assembly | Maiduguri | 30 | 30 APC (as of late 2020–early 2021) | boha.bornostate.gov.ng |
| Cross River State House of Assembly | Calabar | 25 | 18 APC; 7 PDP (Note: 18 PDP assemblymen defected the APC, but in March 2022 their seats were declared vacant by a court. As appeals are expected to the judgement, the practical situation remains at the status quo.) (as of 16 March 2021) | N/A |
| Delta State House of Assembly | Asaba | 29 | 27 PDP; 2 APC (as of 22 September 2021) | deltastate.gov.ng/assembly |
| Ebonyi State House of Assembly | Abakaliki | 24 | 17 APC; 5 PDP; 2 Vacant (Note: The seats of two PDP legislators from Ebonyi were declared vacant due to their defection to the APC; however, both accused the House of forging their defection letters. Appeals are expected to the decision.) (as of 8 March 2022) | ebonyistate.gov.ng/legislative.aspx |
| Edo State House of Assembly | Benin City | 24 (Note: As of March 2022, 14 HOA members (all APC) have not taken office due to a longstanding dispute over their swearing-ins; because of this situation, the practical number of members is ten with nine PDP members and one APC member.) | 9 PDP; 1 APC; 14 Vacant (as of 1 February 2021) | N/A |
| Ekiti State House of Assembly | Ado Ekiti | 26 | 25 APC; 1 Vacant (as of 20 December 2021) | ekitistate.gov.ng/executive-council/legislature/ |
| Enugu State House of Assembly | Enugu | 24 | 24 PDP (as of 16 December 2020) | N/A |
| Gombe State House of Assembly | Gombe | 24 | 21 APC; 3 PDP (as of 6 March 2022) | gombestate.gov.ng/legislative-2 |
| Imo State House of Assembly | Owerri | 27 | 21 APC; 5 PDP; 1 Vacant (Note: In December 2021, Speaker Kennedy Ibe (APC) suspended three APC members due to "dereliction of duty" but in March 2022, one of the suspended assemblymen defected to the PDP. Ibe promptly declared that lawmaker's seat vacant; pending litigation, the practical situation is 19 APC; 5 PDP; 1 Vacant.) (as of 24 December 2021) | N/A |
| Jigawa State House of Assembly | Dutse | 30 | 30 APC (as of early 2021) | jigawastate.gov.ng/state-asembly_1.php |
| Kaduna State House of Assembly | Kaduna | 31 | 20 APC; 10 PDP; 1 Vacant (as of 15 December 2021) | kdsg.gov.ng/legistative/ |
| Kano State House of Assembly | Kano | 40 | 30 APC; 9 NNPP; 1 PDP (as of 15 May 2022) | kanoassembly.gov.ng/ |
| Katsina State House of Assembly | Katsina | 34 | 34 APC (as of late 2020–early 2021) | N/A |
| Kebbi State House of Assembly | Birnin Kebbi | 24 | 24 APC (as of 24 August 2021) | kebbistate.gov.ng/lagislative |
| Kogi State House of Assembly | Lokoja | 25 | 25 APC (as of April 2021) | N/A |
| Kwara State House of Assembly | Ilorin | 24 | 21 APC; 1 PDP; 2 Vacant (Note: In July 2021, the Kwara HOA suspended one PDP member due to "contempt and abuse of privilege;" due to this suspension, the practical situation is just 21 APC members. Months later, in March and May 2022, the HOA declared two members' seat vacant after they defected from the APC to the SDP; the matter is currently in court.) (as of 19 May 2021) | kwha.gov.ng/ |
| Lagos State House of Assembly | Ikeja | 40 | 40 APC (as of 20 December 2020) | lagoshouseofassembly.gov.ng |
| Nasarawa State House of Assembly | Lafia | 24 | 20 APC; 3 PDP; 1 ZLP (Note: In September 2021, the Nasarawa HOA suspended one PDP member due to "alleged involvement in the employment of 38 fake secondary school teachers"; due to this suspension, the practical situation is 20 APC; 2 PDP; 1 ZLP.) (as of 13 September 2021) | nasarawastate.gov.ng/the-legislature/ |
| Niger State House of Assembly | Minna | 27 | 26 APC; 1 PDP (as of early 2021) | N/A |
| Ogun State House of Assembly | Abeokuta | 26 | 25 APC; 1 PDP (as of 23 February 2021) | ogha.og.gov.ng |
| Ondo State House of Assembly | Akure | 26 | 22 APC; 2 PDP; 1 ZLP; 1 Vacant (Note: In March 2022, the Ondo HOA declared a member's seat vacant after he defected from the APC to the PDP; the matter is currently in court.) (as of 31 March 2022) | ondostate.gov.ng/index.php/hoa-members |
| Osun State House of Assembly | Osogbo | 26 | 23 APC; 3 PDP (as of 6 June 2019) | N/A |
| Oyo State House of Assembly | Ibadan | 32 | 26 PDP; 5 APC; 1 ADP (as of 10 June 2019) | oyostate.gov.ng/the-legislature |
| Plateau State House of Assembly | Jos | 24 | 14 APC; 7 PDP; 1 LP; 2 Vacant (as of 22 March 2022) | N/A |
| Rivers State House of Assembly | Port Harcourt | 32 | 32 PDP (as of 10 June 2019) | riversstate.gov.ng/legislative |
| Sokoto State House of Assembly | Sokoto | 30 | 17 PDP; 13 APC (as of 14 April 2022) | N/A |
| Taraba State House of Assembly | Jalingo | 24 | 15 PDP; 5 APC; 4 Vacant (as of 22 June 2022) | tarabastate.gov.ng/legislative-branch |
| Yobe State House of Assembly | Damaturu | 24 | 24 APC (as of 2021) | yobestate.gov.ng/legislative |
| Zamfara State House of Assembly | Gusau | 24 | 21 APC; 1 PDP; 2 Vacant (as of 10 February 2022) | N/A |
