= Kebbi State House of Assembly =

Legislative arm of the government of Kebbi State of Nigeria

The Kebbi State House of Assembly is the legislative arm of the government of Kebbi State of Nigeria. It is a unicameral legislature with 24 members elected from the 24 local government areas of the state.

== See also ==
- Houses of assembly of Nigerian states
