= Shama language =

Kainji language spoken in Nigeria

Shama
- Tushama
- Native to: Nigeria
- Region: Niger State
- Native speakers: (5,000 cited 1995)
- Language family: Niger–Congo?: Atlantic–Congo; Benue–Congo; Kainji; Kamuku; Shama
- Dialects: Sama; Sambuga

Language codes
- ISO 639-3: sqa
- Glottolog: sham1278

Shama
- Person: Bushama
- People: Ushama
- Language: Tushama

Shama, or Shama-Sambuga after its two dialects, is a Kainji language of Nigeria.

Sambuga is presumably extinct. It was spoken in Sambuga town, 10 km northwest of Kagara, in Rafi LGA, Niger State.
