= Cinda-Regi language =

Kainji language complex spoken in Nigeria

Kamuku
- Cinda-Regi
- ‘Yara
- Native to: Nigeria
- Region: Niger State, Kaduna State
- Ethnicity: Kamuku
- Native speakers: 45,000 (2010)
- Language family: Niger–Congo?: Atlantic–Congo; Benue–Congo; Kainji; Kamuku; Kamuku
- Dialects: Cinda; Regi; Rogo (Orogo); Kuki; Kuru; Maruba; Shiyabe

Language codes
- ISO 639-3: cdr
- Glottolog: cind1241

Cinda
- Person: buCinda
- People: uCinda
- Language: tuCinda

Regi
- Person: buRegi
- People: uRegi
- Language: tuRegi

Kuki
- Person: buKuki
- People: uKuki
- Language: tuKuki

The Cinda-Regi language (commonly known as Kamuku and also known as ‘Yara or Cinda-Regi-Kuki-Kuru-Maruba) is a language complex of Nigeria belonging to the Kamuku branch of Kainji languages.

== Geographic distribution ==
The Kamuku language is spoken in various parts of northern Nigeria. This include Kaduna State (Birnin Gwari), Kebbi State, Kwara State, Niger State (Chanchaga, Rafi, Mariga, Kontagora and Minna) and Sokoto State (Sokoto).

== Varieties ==
There are four main varieties: Cinda, Regi, Rogo (Orogo), and Kuki. Kuru and Maruba, both named after villages, are close to each other. Shiyabe is closely related to the Rogo language. However, Rogo can refer to two varieties, namely a Cinda-Regi variety and another non-Cinda-Regi variety (Rogo II).

== Names ==
Names for the Cinda-Regi languages:

| Common name (root) | One person | The people | The language |
|---|---|---|---|
| Cinda | buCinda | uCinda | tuCinda |
| Regi | buRegi | uRegi | tuRegi |
| Rogo | bɔRɔgo | oRogo | tòRógó |
| Kuki | buKuki | uKuki | tuKuki |
| Kuru | Kuru | Kuru | Kuru |
| Maruba | Maruba | Maruba | Maruba |
| Shiyabe | Shiyabe | Shiyabe | Shiyabe |
