= Kamuku languages =

Branch of Kainji languages spoken in Nigeria

Kamuku
- Geographic distribution: Niger State, western Nigeria
- Ethnicity: Kamuku people
- Linguistic classification: Niger–Congo?: Atlantic–Congo; Benue–Congo; Kainji; Kamuku

Language codes
- ISO 639-3: –
- Glottolog: kamu1261

The Kamuku languages are a branch of the Kainji languages spoken by the Kamuku people of Niger State, western Nigeria, mostly in Mariga and Rafi LGAs.

Although formerly classified as Kamuku, Pongu is now placed in a related branch, the Pongu (Shiroro) languages, and Western Acipa (Cipu) with the Kambari languages.

== Languages ==
=== Blench (2012) ===
Blench (2012) lists the following Kamuku languages and their sociolinguistic situations. Kamuku internal classification can be briefly summarised as:

- Proto-Kamuku
  - Hungwəryə
  - Core Kamuku (‘Yara)
    - Cinda-Regi: Cinda, Regi-Shiyabe, Orogo, Kuki; Kuru-Maruba
    - Səgəmuk (Zubazuba); Sama-Sambuga
    - Kagare
    - Rogo II

‘Yara, or Cinda-Regi-Kuki-Kuru-Maruba, is the largest Kamuku subgroup. There are four main Cinda-Regi varieties, Cinda, Regi, Orogo, and Kuki. Kuru and Maruba, both named after villages, are close to each other. Shiyabe is close to tuRogo. However, Rogo can refer to two varieties, namely a Cinda-Regi variety and another non-Cinda-Regi variety (Rogo II). Səgəmuk (Zubazuba), Tushyabe, and Turubaruba are all spoken in Igwama town of Mariga LGA, Niger State.

Kagare (Kwagere) is spoken in Unguwar Tanko village. There is partial intelligibility with Cinda, Regi and Səgəmuk (Zubazuba).

Names for various Kamuku languages:

Names for various Kamuku languages
Common name (root)	One person	People	Language
Ucinda	Bucinda	uCinda	tuCinda
Regi	Buregi	uRegi	Turegi
Rɔgo	Bɔrɔgo	u-rɔgɔ	Turɔgo
Canja	Bucanja	Ucanja	Tucanja
Bɔroma	Mutabɔroma	Utabɔroma	Tabɔroma
Shama	Bushama	Ushama	Tushama
Sambuga	Busambuga	Usambuga	Tusambuga
Sundura	buSundura	uSundura	Tusundura

==== Extinct languages ====
Extinct Kamuku languages:

- Sambuga (extinct) and Shama (still spoken) are closely related.
- Makɨci (? [məkɨci]) was an extinct Kamuku language spoken in Makɨci village and in a village cluster a few kilometres east of Igwama.
- Ingwai (Inkwai) is extinct.
- The village of Saya may have also spoken a Kamuku language. Ingwai and Saya speakers have both switched to Hausa.
- Kwacika (extinct) is reported to be a Kamuku language.

=== Blench (2018) ===
Kamuku classification by Blench (2018):

- Kamuku
  - Hungwəryə
  - Core Kamuku (‘Yara)
    - Sama-Sambuga (extinct)
    - Makici (extinct)
    - Zubazuba
    - Inkwai (extinct)
    - Regi, Kuki, Rogo-Shyabe
    - Cinda cluster

Each lect is generally identified with an individual hill in the Mariga area of Niger State.

== See also ==
- Pongu languages, also known as Kamuku languages
