= Kebbie =

Kebbie may refer to

- Kebbie Town in Sierra Leone
- Brimah Kebbie, English rugby league and rugby union player of Sierra Leonean descent
- Elliot Kebbie (born 1994), English footballer of Sierra Leonean descent, son of Brimah

== See also ==
- Kebbi State
