= Argungu Fishing Festival =

Annual festival in Northern Nigeria

Coordinates: 12°44′55″N 4°32′18″E

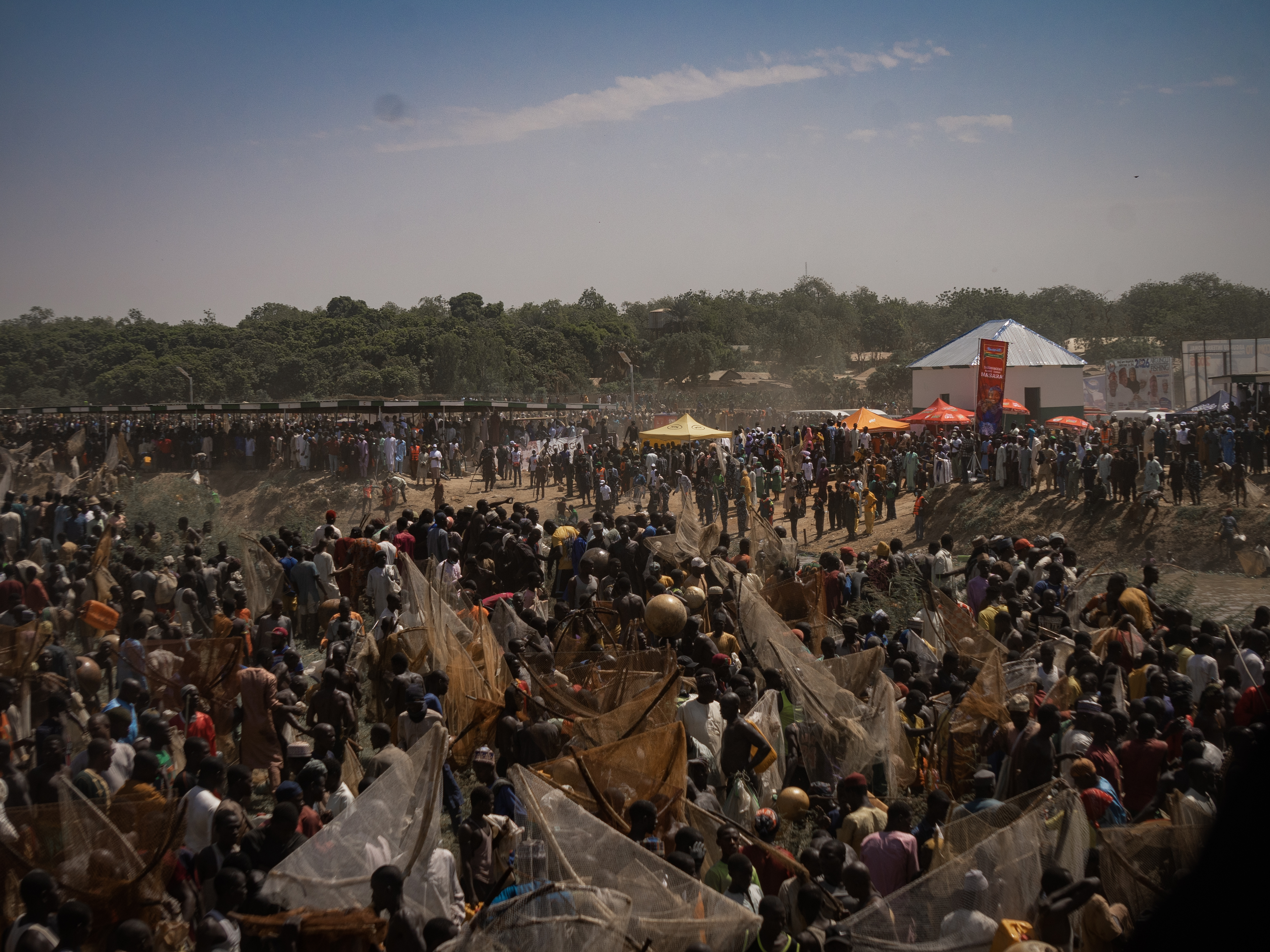
- Location: Kebbi
- Country: Nigeria
- Inaugurated: 1934

Argungu international fishing and cultural festival
- UNESCO Intangible Cultural Heritage
- Country: Nigeria
- Reference: 00271
- Region: Africa

Inscription history
- Inscription: 2016 (11th session)
- List: Representative

The Argungu Fishing Festival or Argungu Dance Festival is an annual four-day festival fishing and cultural festival in Argungu, Kebbi State. The festival is usually a four-day cultural event which main purpose involves fishermen from different part of the country trying to catch the biggest fish from the Sokoto River. The region is made up of fertile river areas of matanfada, mala with much irrigation and orchards (lambu in Hausa). The majority of inhabitants are Muslim fishermen. The Kanta Museum is the main historical centre in Argungu for visitors across the globe. People from around the world travel to Argungu just to witness the occasion.

== History ==
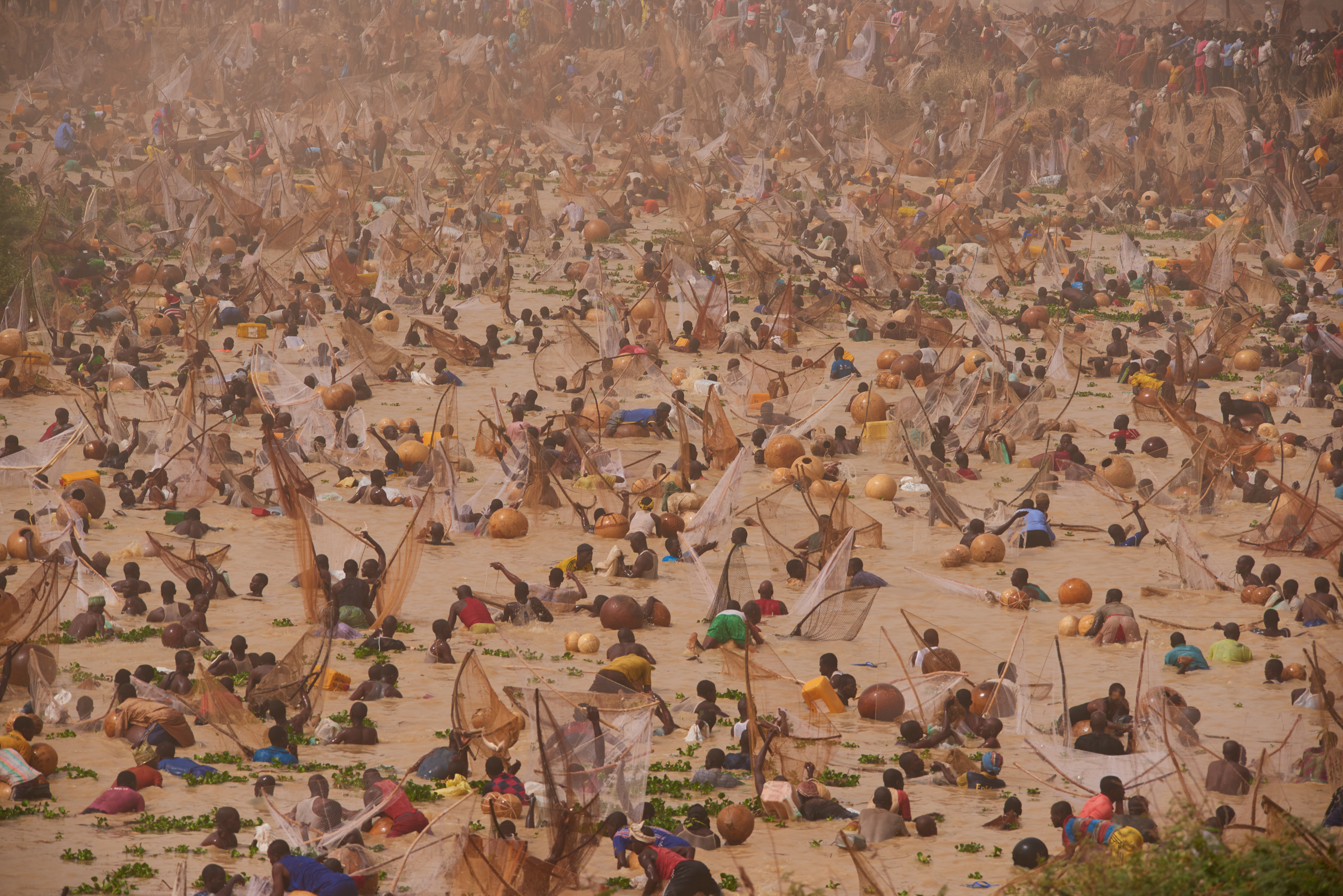
Argungu fishing festival

The festival began in the year 1934 as a mark of the end of the centuries-old hostility between the Sokoto Caliphate and the Kebbi Kingdom. This festival has brought huge progress to the development of the state as a whole.

It is usually called a Fishing-Frenzy Festival. The festival is celebrated to mark the beginning of the fishing season in Argungu, a river-side town in Kebbi State. It is celebrated between February and March every year.

In 2005 the winning fish weighed 75 kg, and needed four men to hoist it onto the scales. In 2006, the festival banned fishing due to safety concerns relating to the low water levels. The importance of the festival to the economy has led the government to conserve fish stock by prohibiting the use of gill nets and cast nets. The Zauro polder project, an irrigation scheme in the Rima River floodplain to the south of Argungu, has been criticized because the reservoir threatens to flood the traditional site of the festival.

Activities include:

- Craft showcases
- Canoe races
- Agricultural showcases
- Cultural activities
- Wrestling matches
- Musical performances
- A Grand Fishing conquest
- Swimming contest

== Competition ==
On the final day of the festival a competition is held in which thousands of men line up along the river and at the sound of a gunshot, all of them jump into the river and have an hour to catch the largest fish. The winner can take home as much as US$7,500. Competitors are only allowed to use traditional fishing tools and many prefer to catch fish entirely by hand (a practice also popular elsewhere and known as "noodling") to demonstrate their prowess.

== 2020 Argungu Fishing Festival ==
Fisher men during Argungun fishing festival

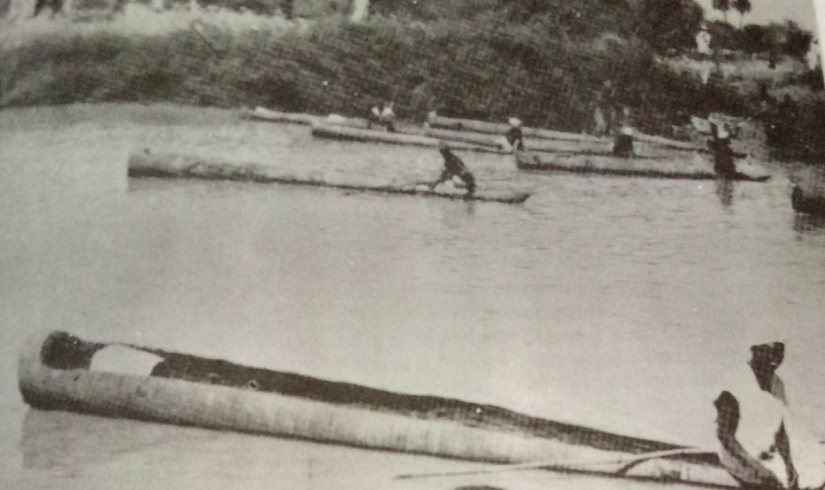
Fisher men in canoes.

In the 2020 Argungu Fishing Festival, the individual who caught the biggest fish weighing about 78 kilograms was awarded N10 million, two new cars and two seats for a Hajj trip. Second place and third place prizes were also awarded. Over 50,000 fishermen participated in the annual festival held in Kebbi State and the winners were graded based on the weight of the fish caught. The President of Nigeria, Muhammadu Buhari visited the 2020 Argungu Fishing Festival The festival in 2020 was the 60th edition after 10 years of being on hold according to the governor of the state Abubakar Bagudu. In addition, one of the festival's goals is to enrich community unity and encourage local fish farmers.

== Modern Revival and Recent Edition ==
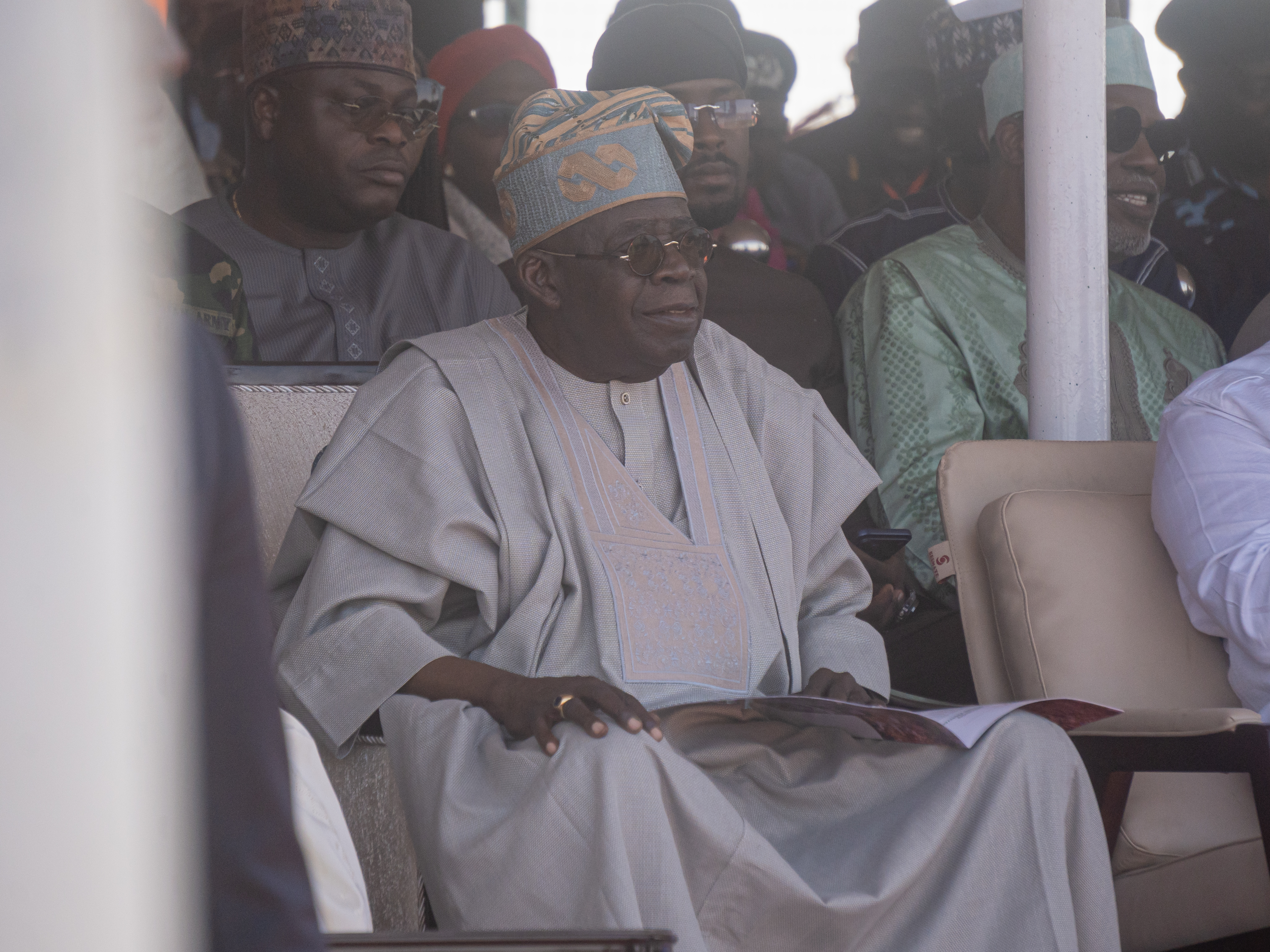
President Bola Tinubu at 61st Argungu festival

The festival experienced a periods of suspension due to security challenges but has been revived by the Kebbi State Government to promote tourism and cultural heritage.

The 61st edition of the festival was held from 11 to 14 of February 2026 in Argungu. The event attracted thousands of participants and visitors and was attended by several dignitaries, including President Bola Ahmed Tinubu and Nasir Idris the executive Governor of Kebbi State. The edition featured traditional fishing contests, cultural displays, and other activities highlighting the cultural heritage of Kebbi State.

=== Images from 61st Argungu fishing and cultural festival ===
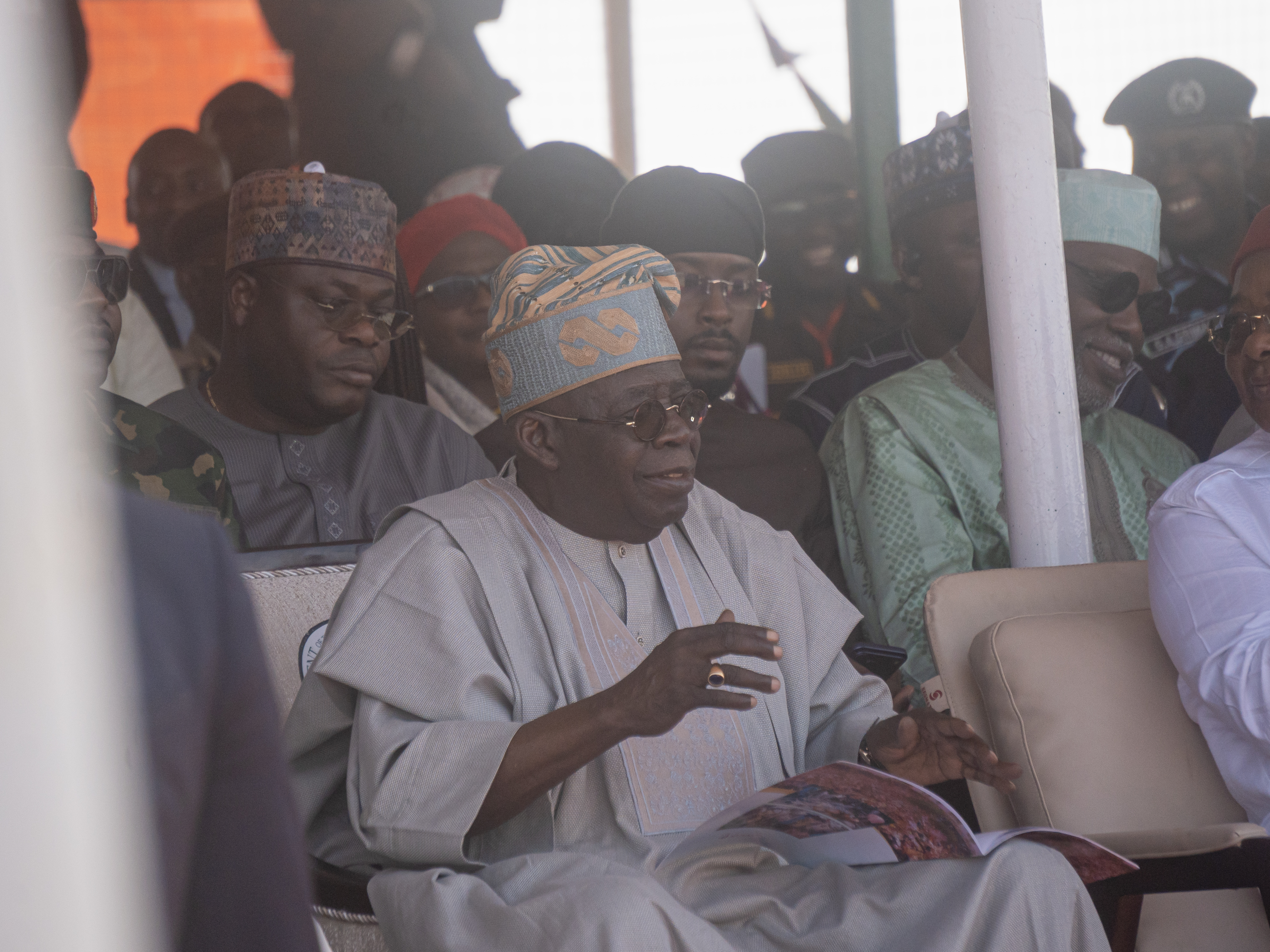

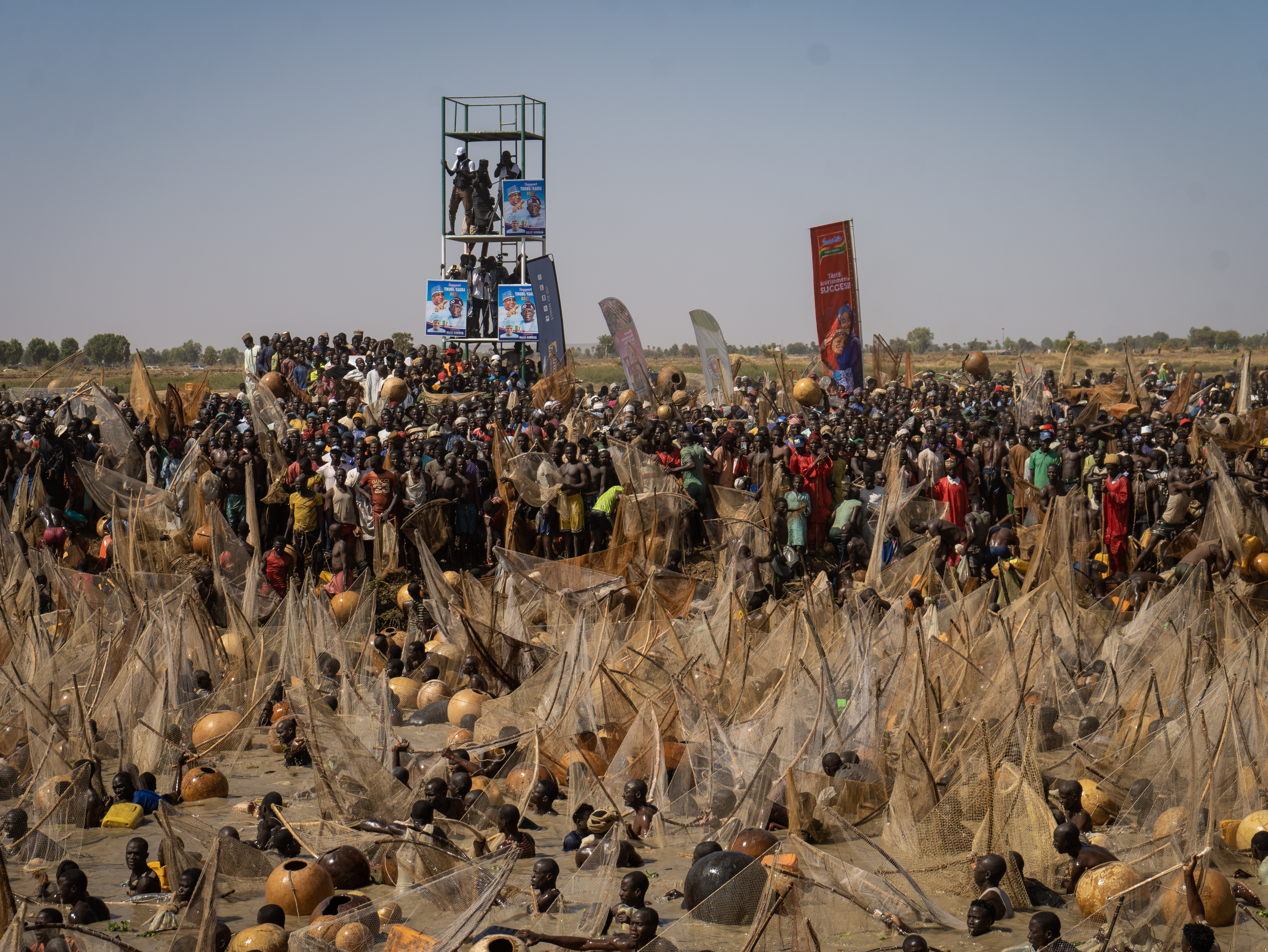

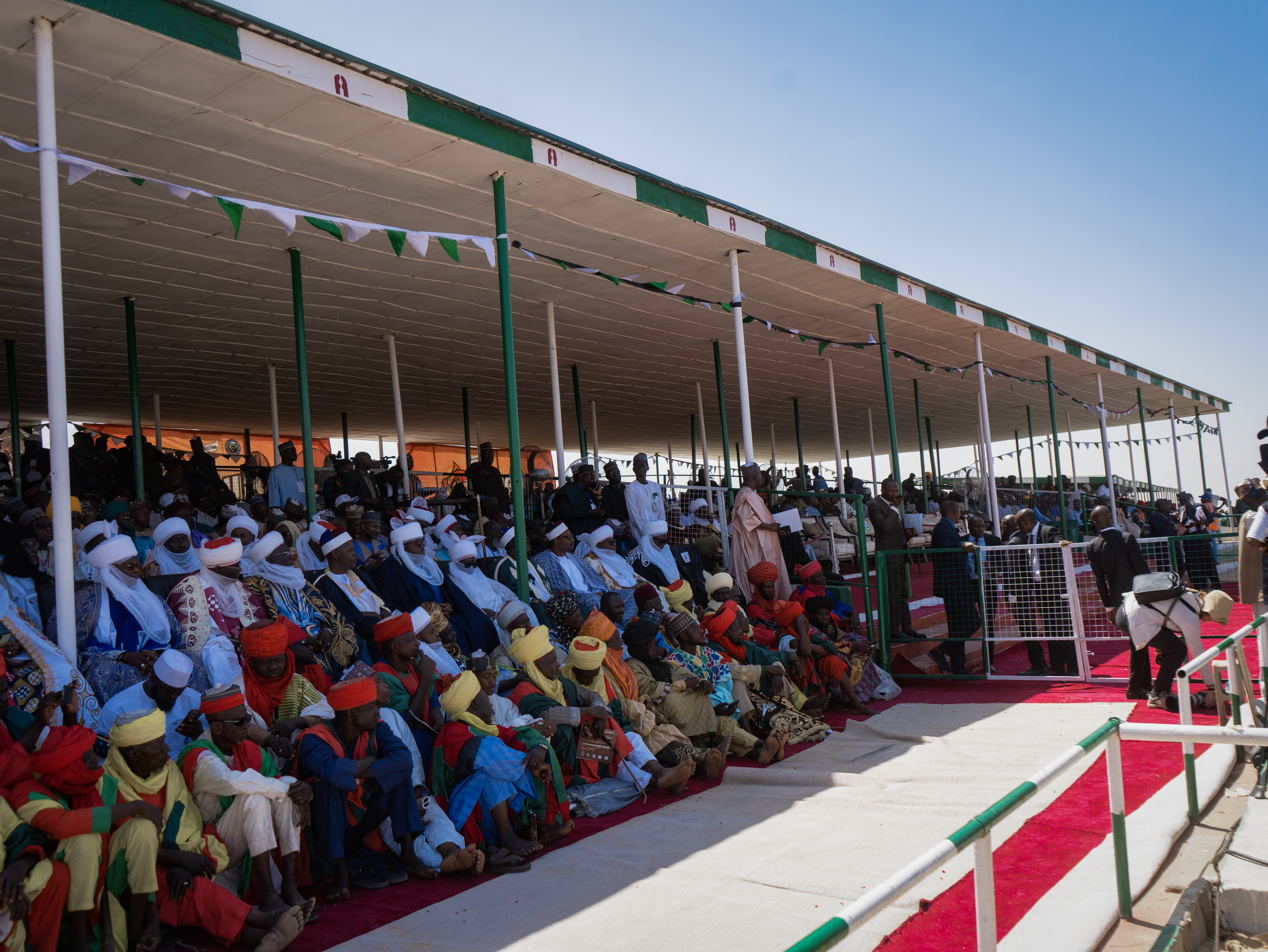

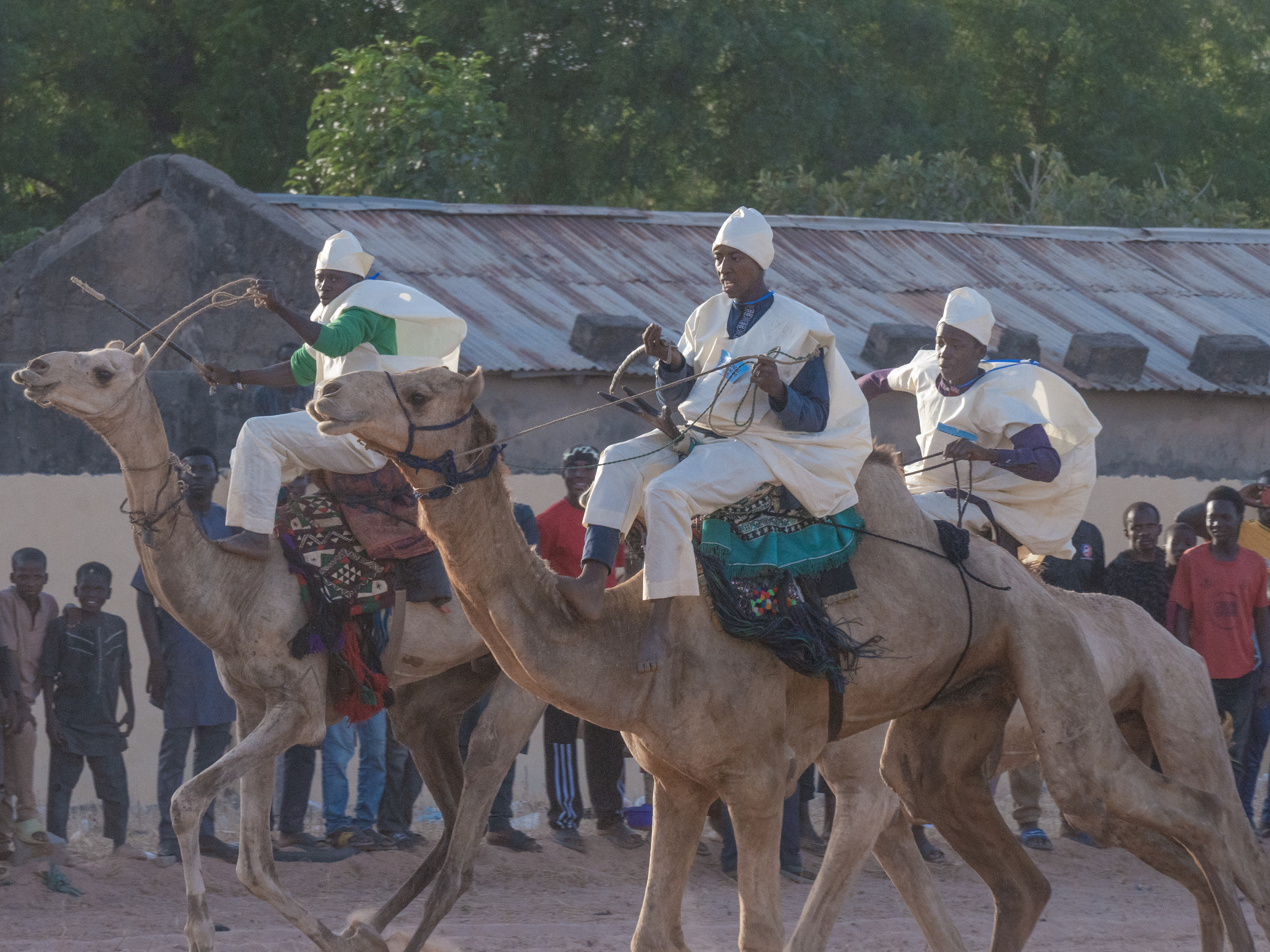

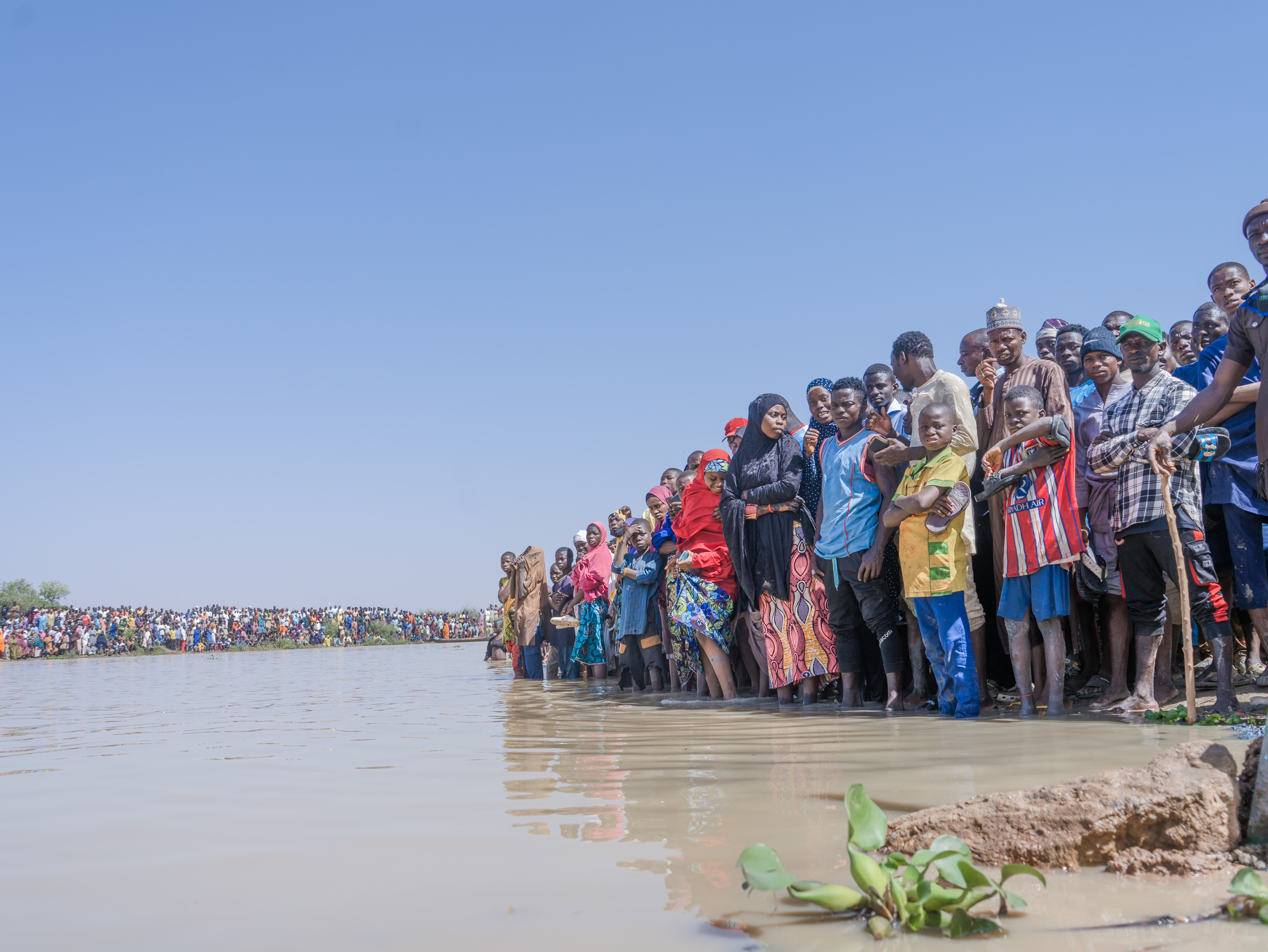

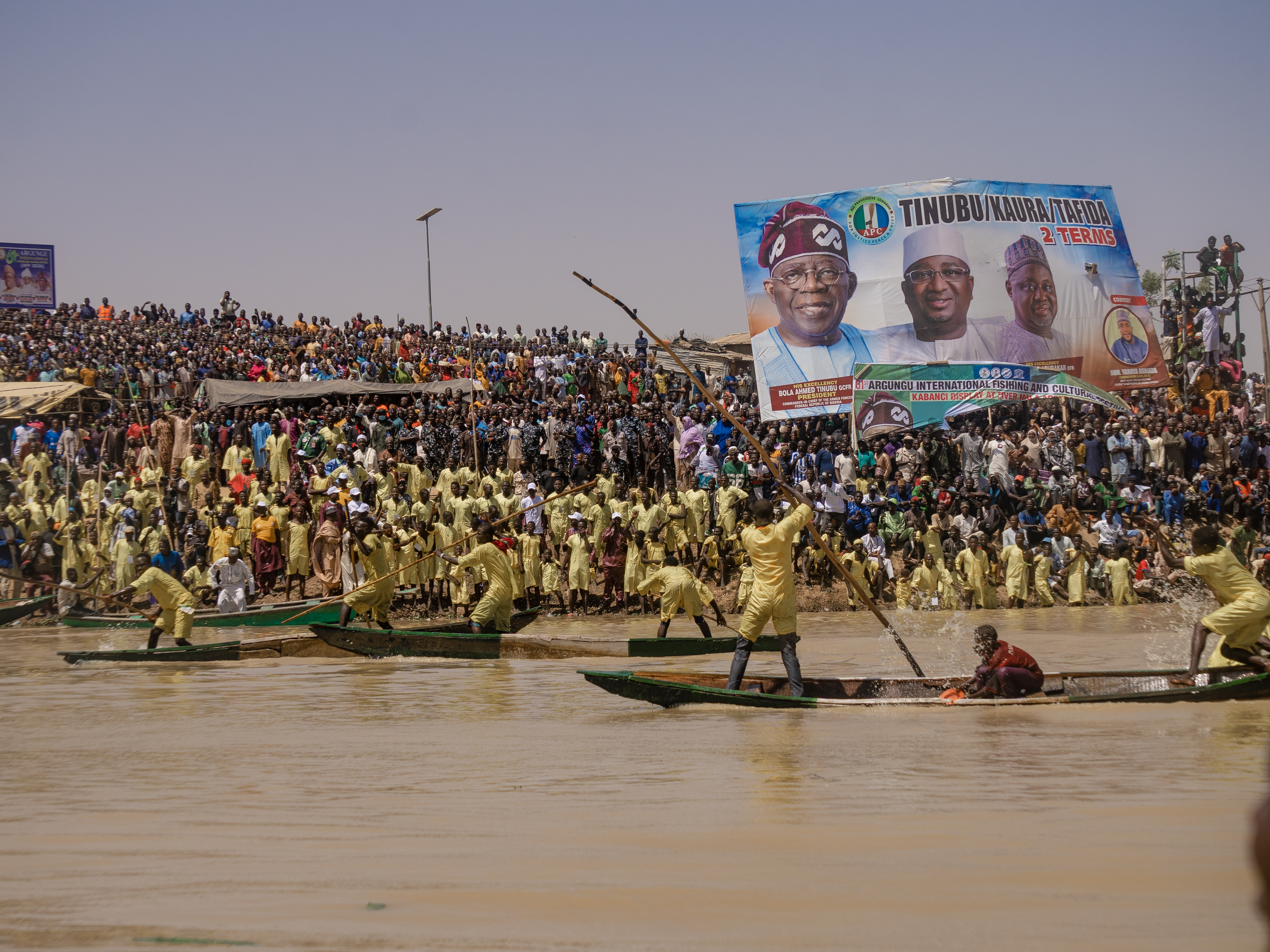

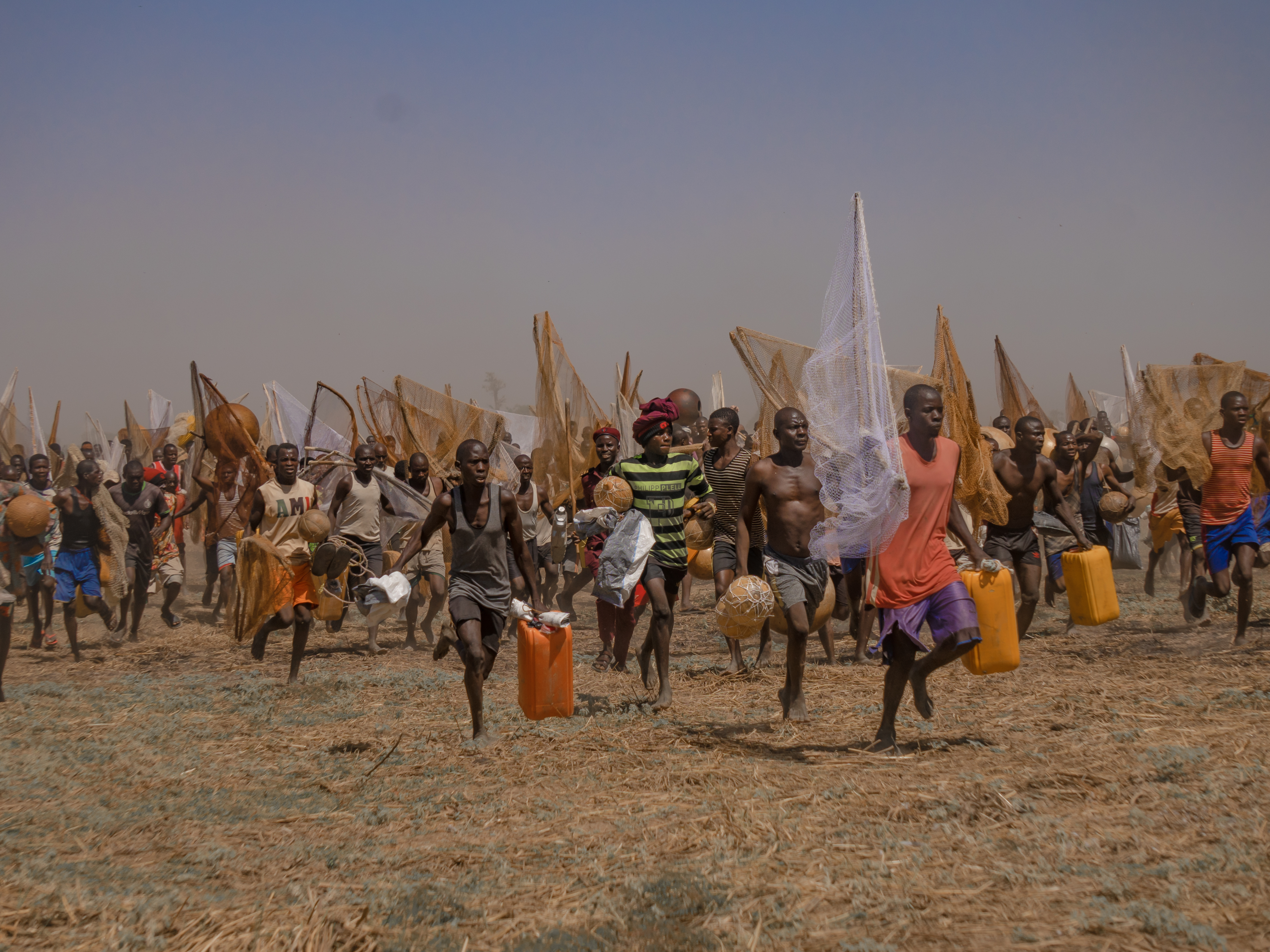

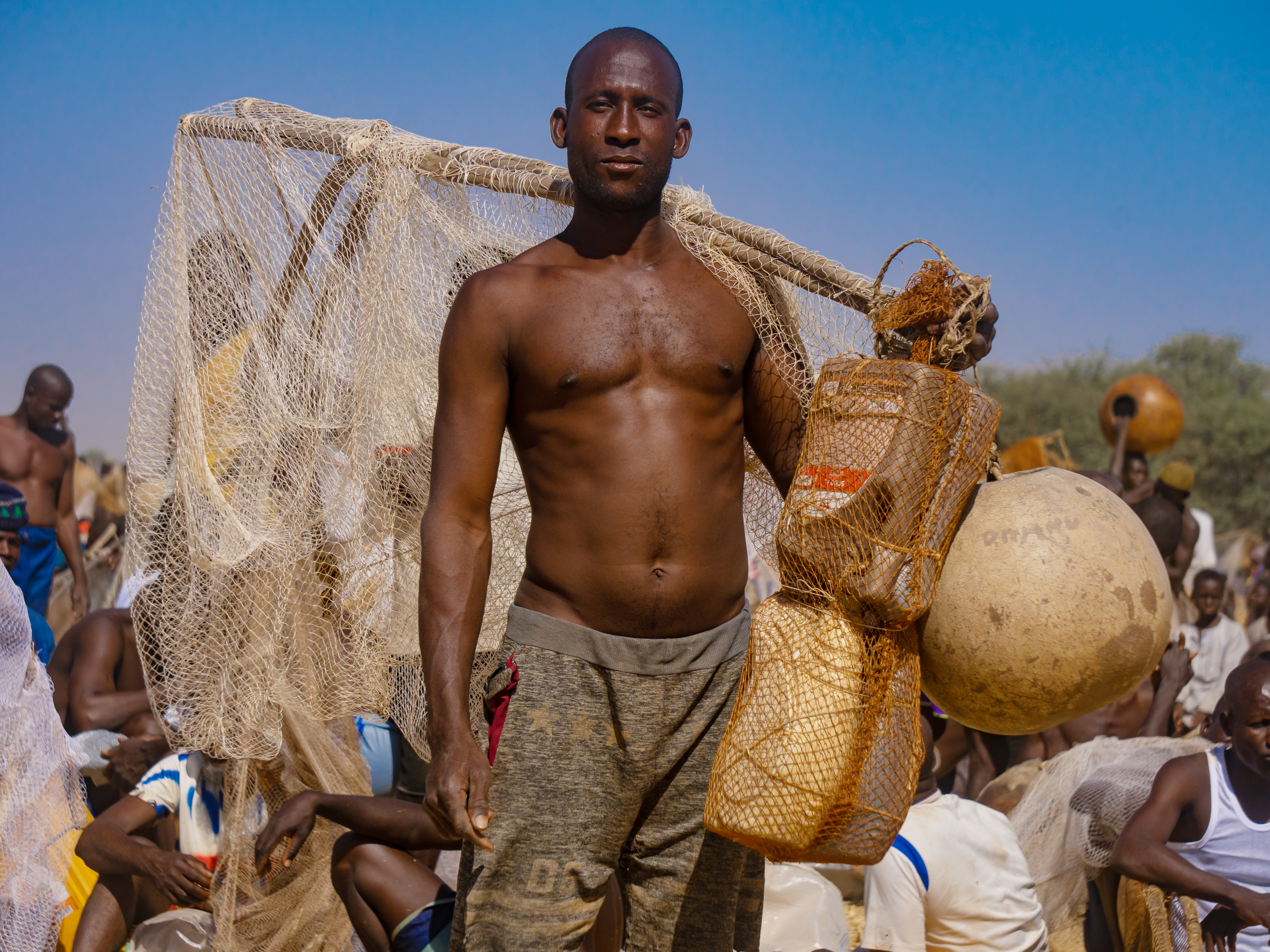

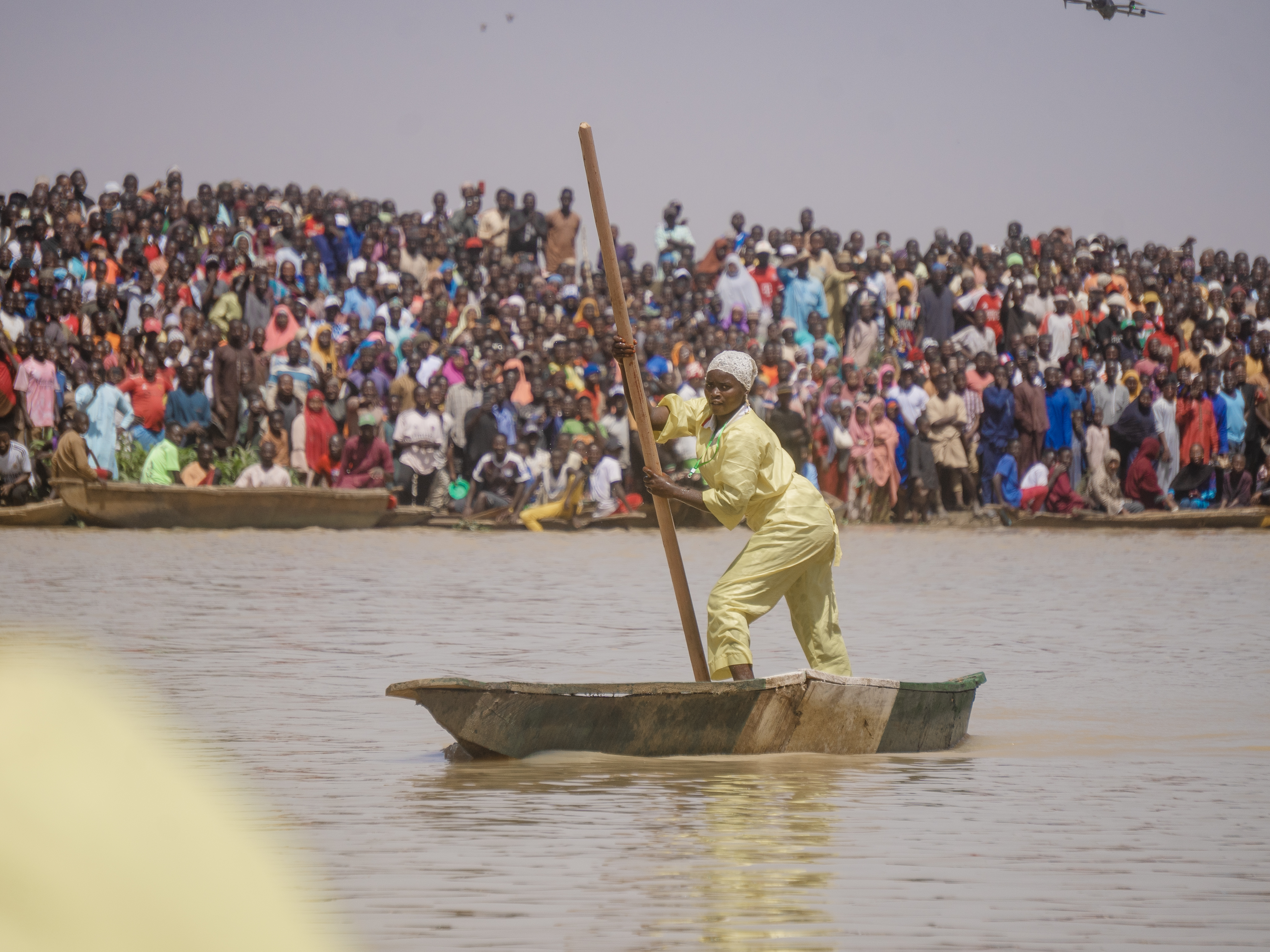

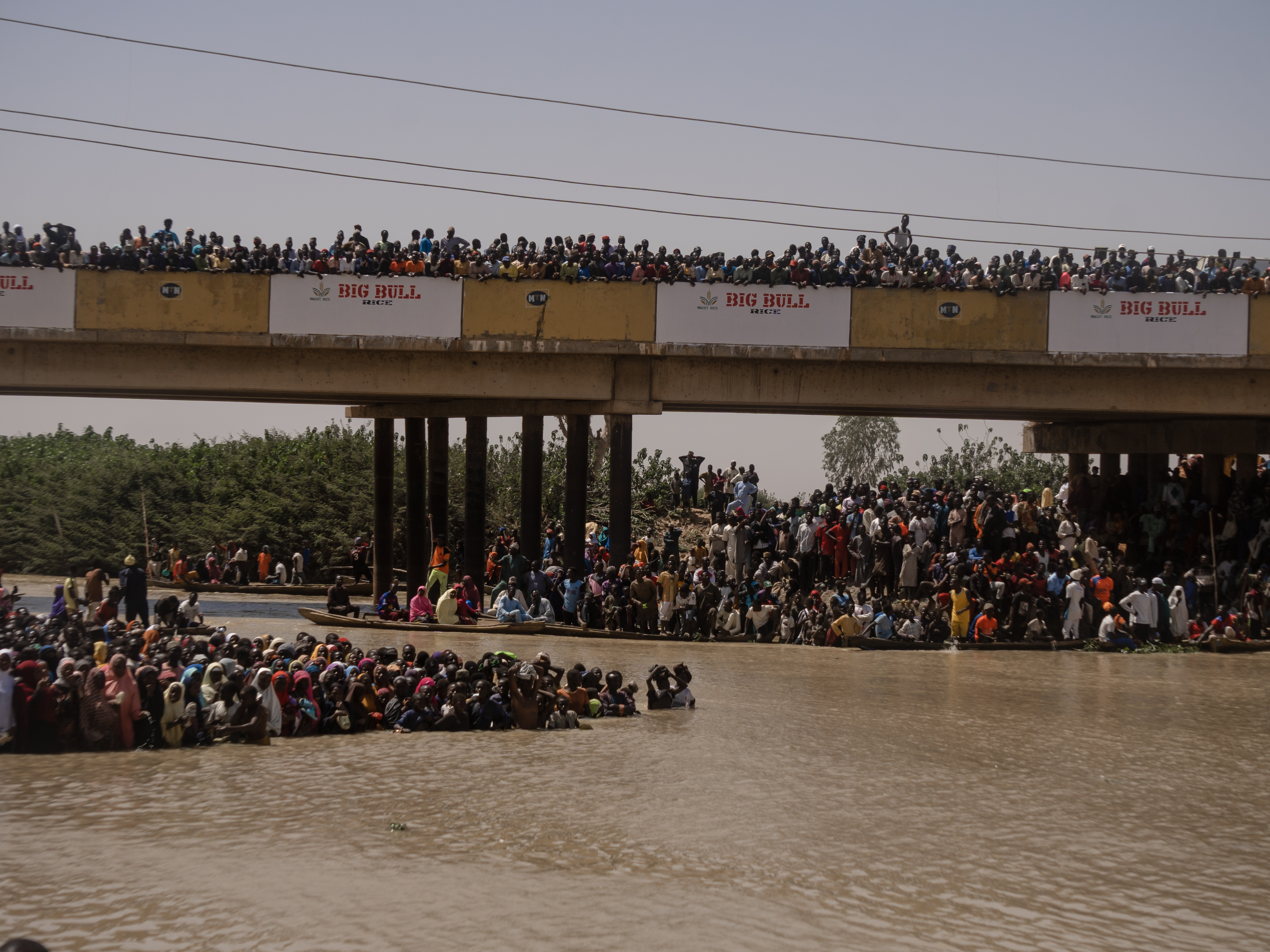

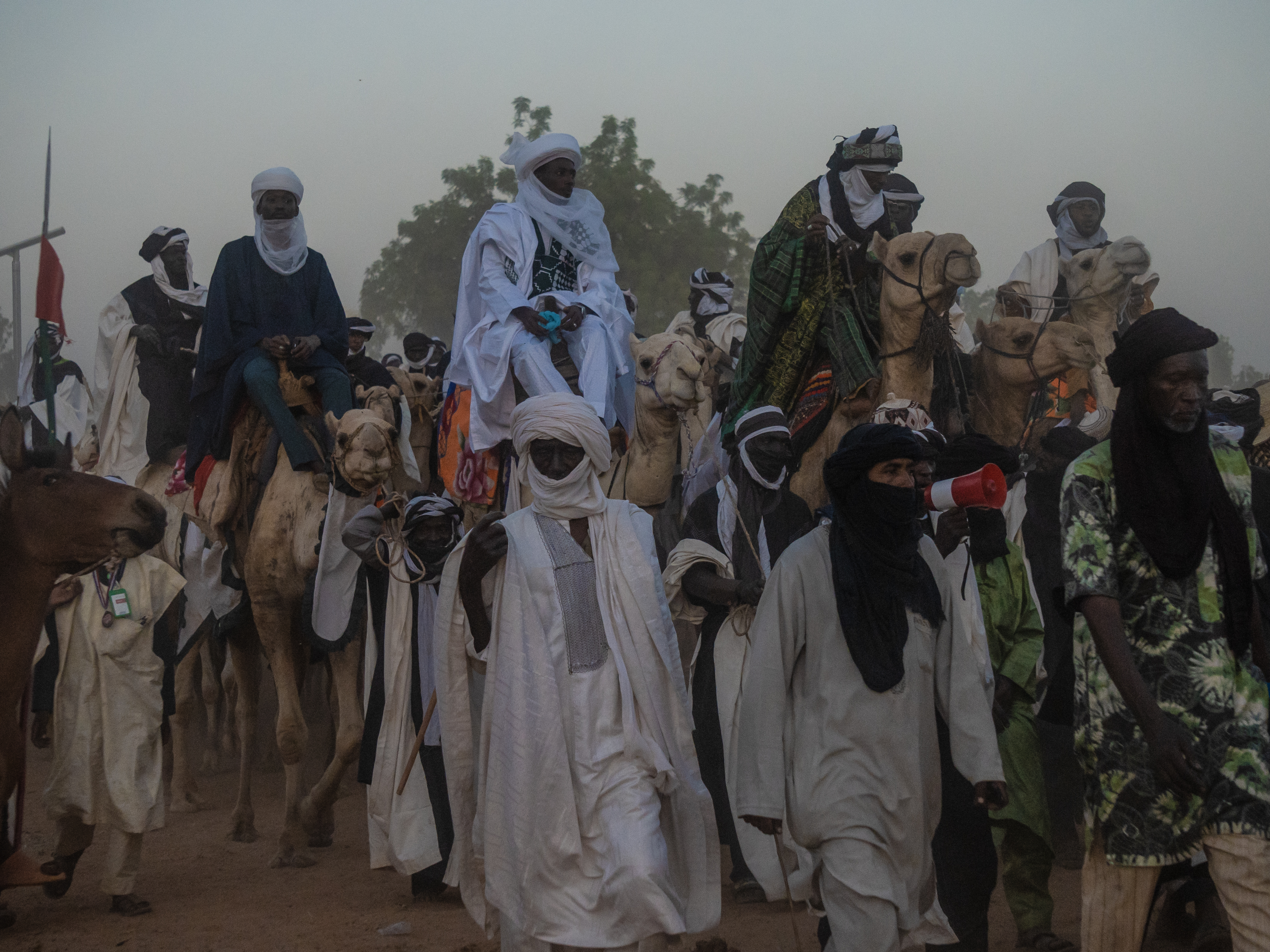

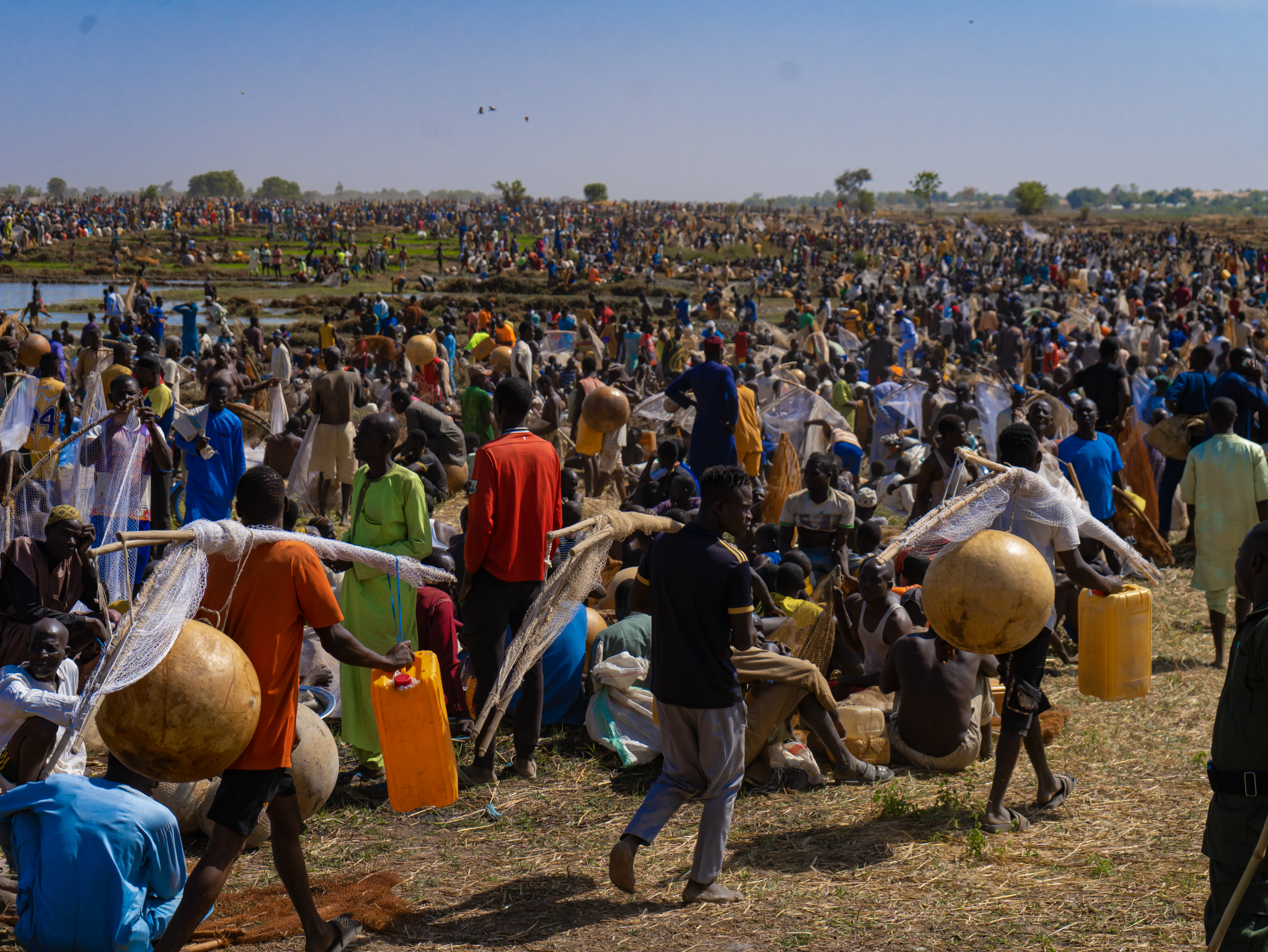

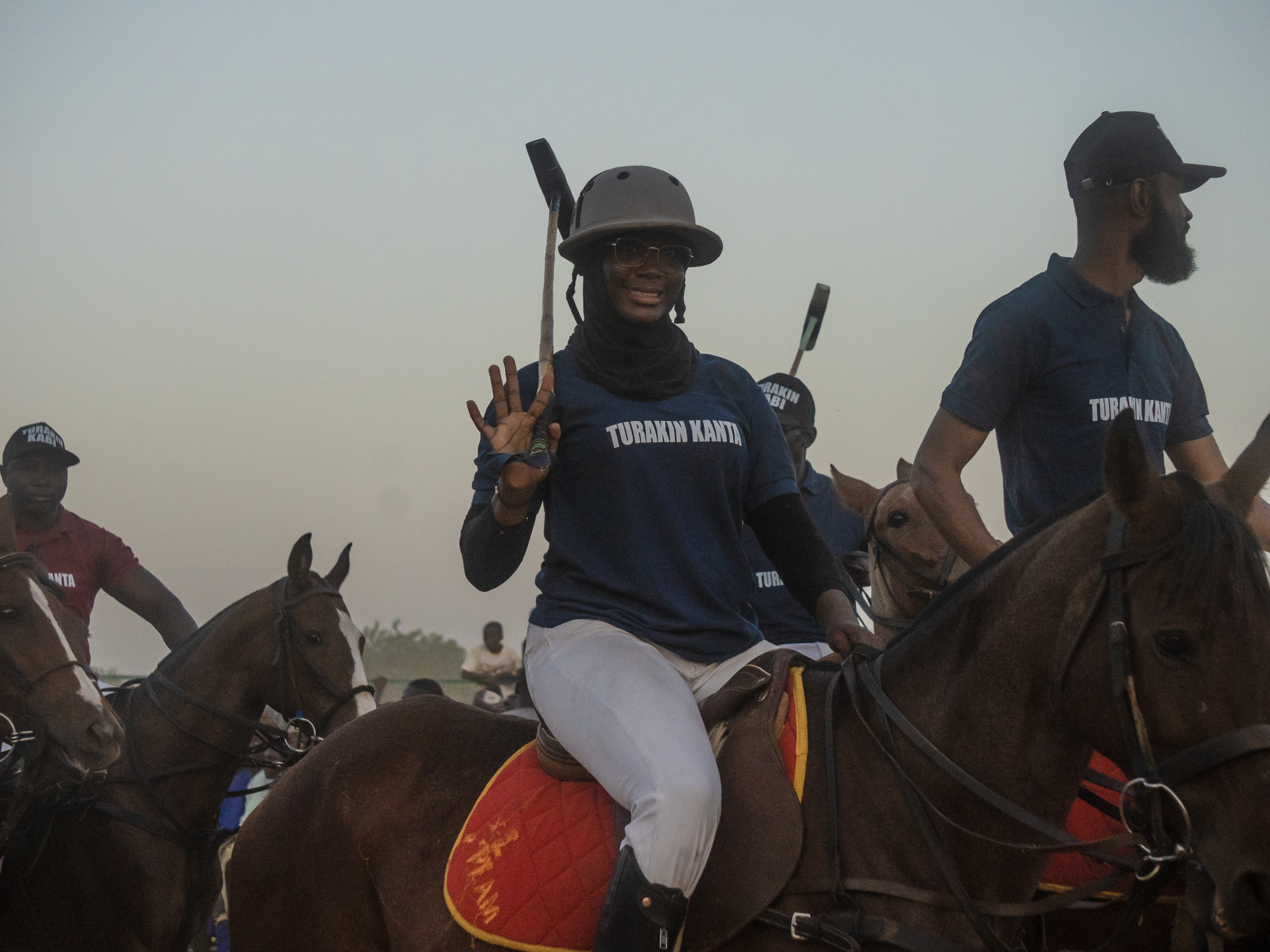

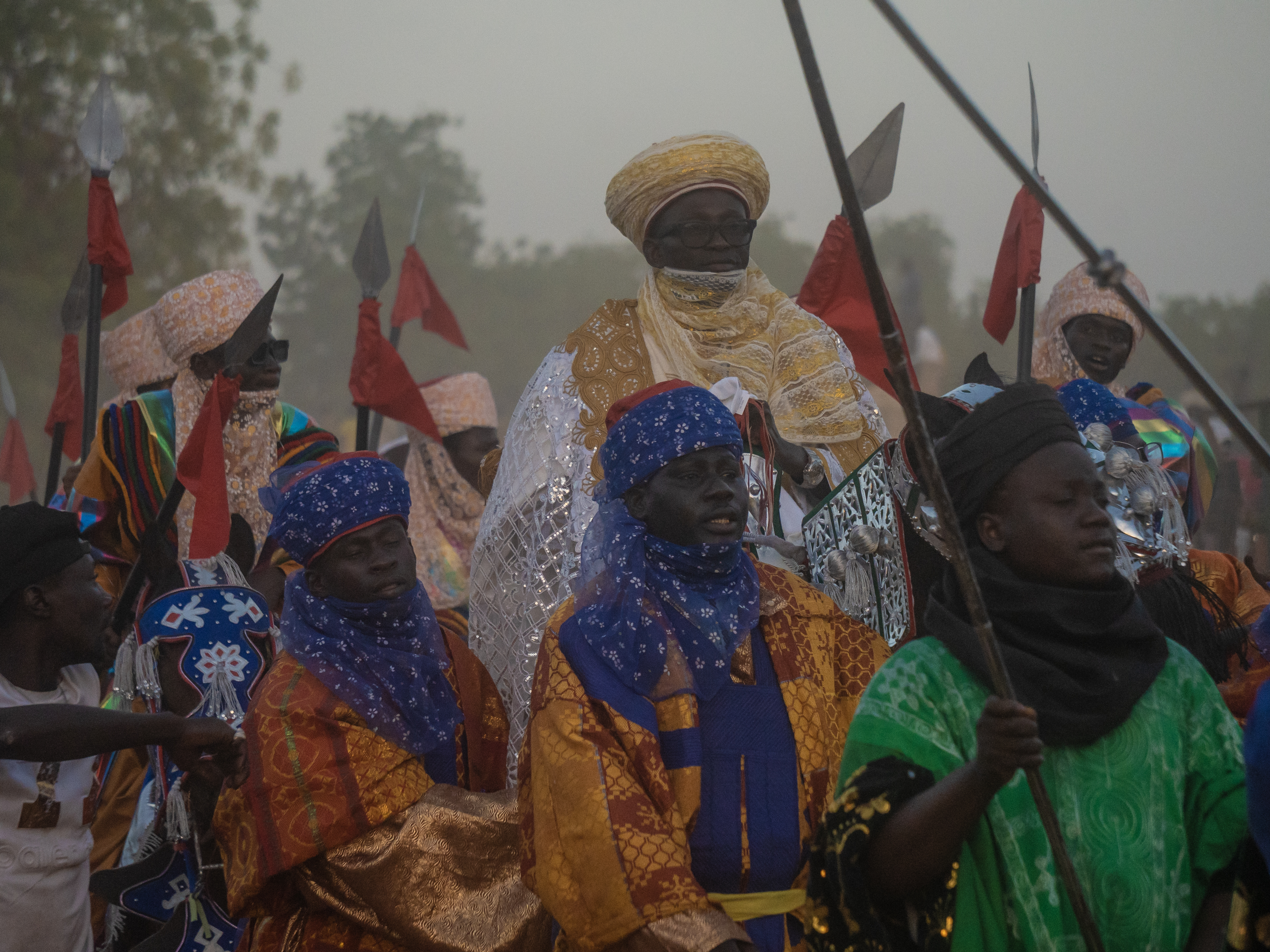

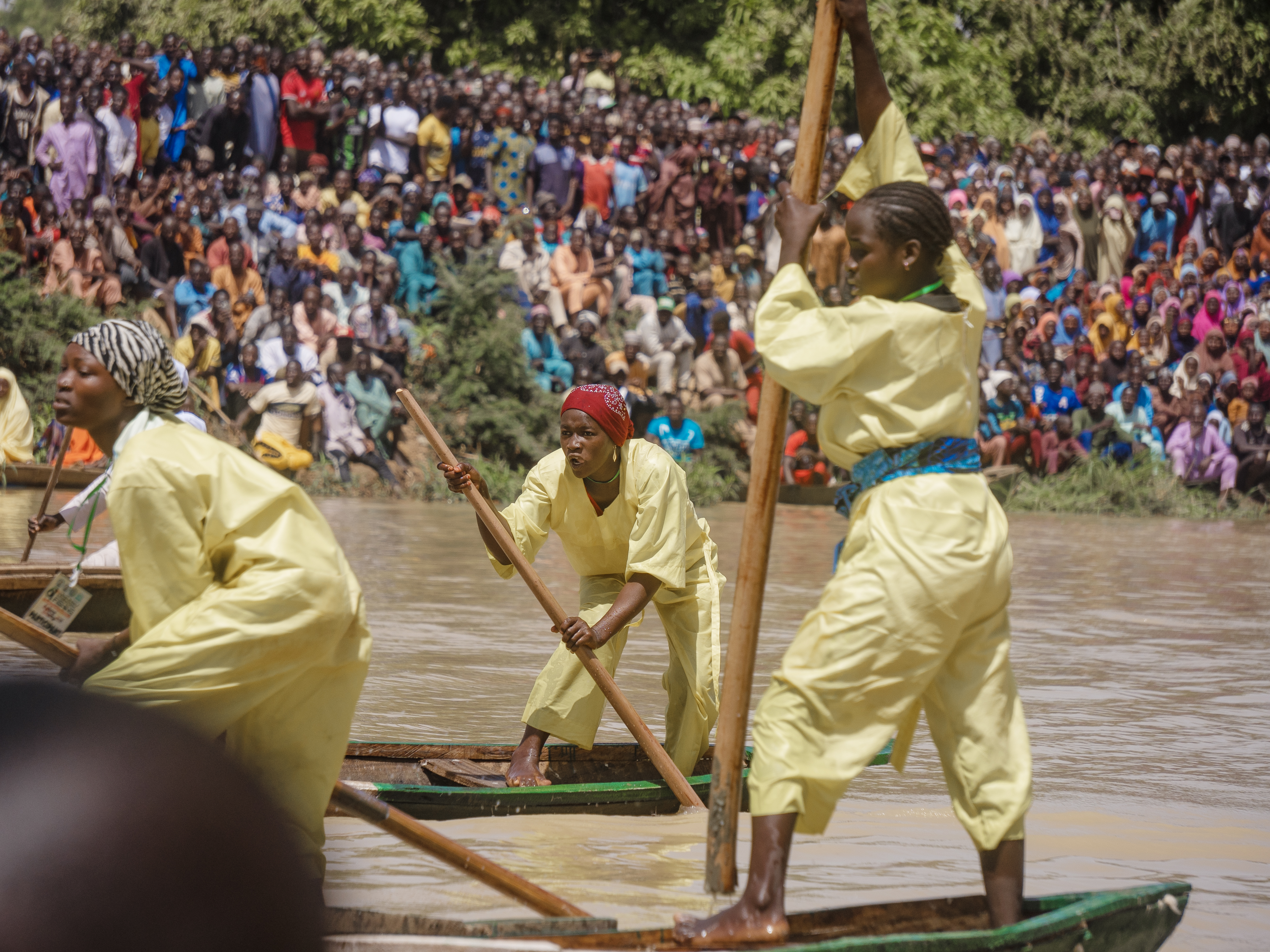

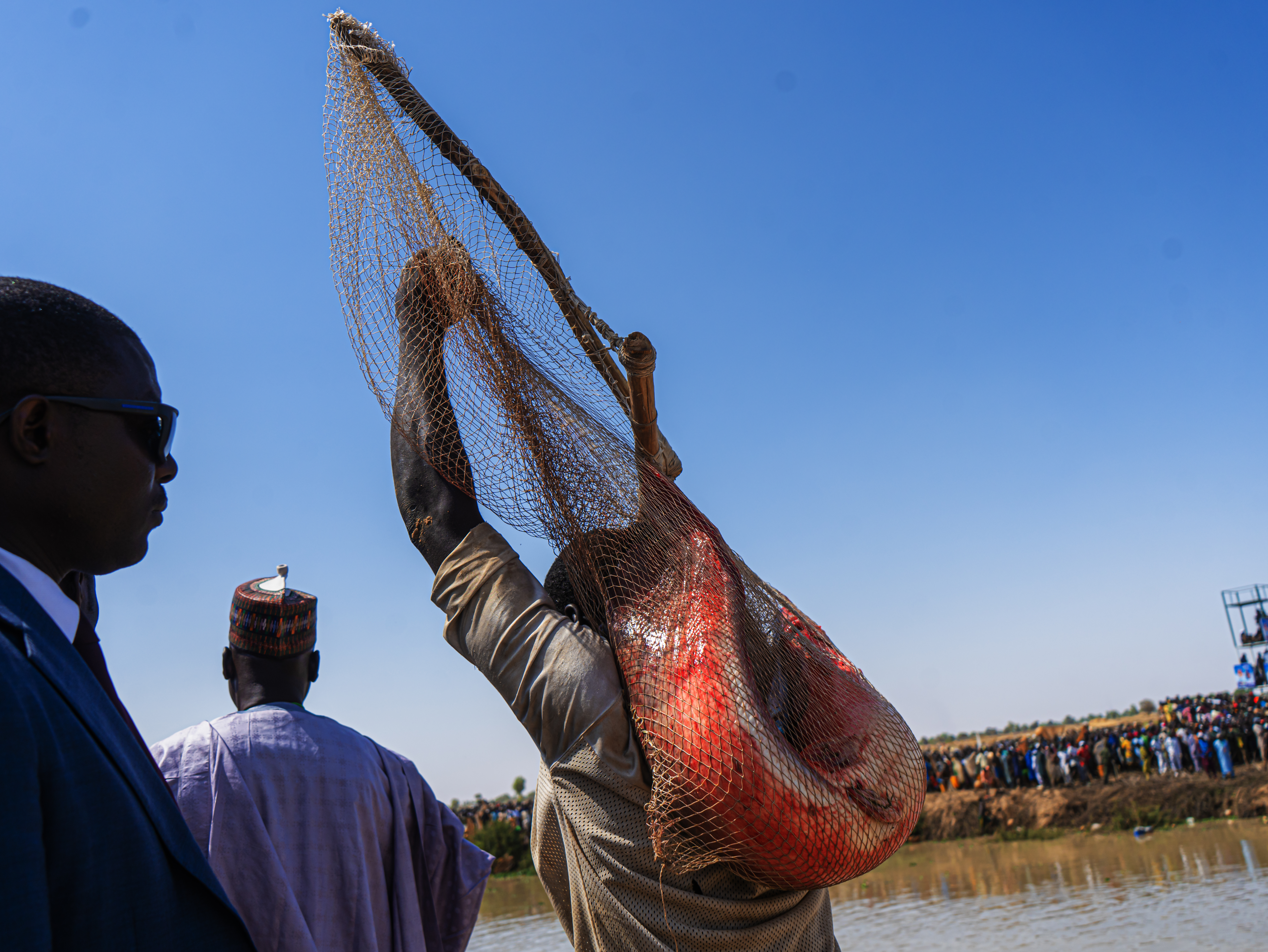

== See also ==
- Festivals in Nigeria
