= Sakaba =

Local government area in Kebbi, Nigeria

- LGA and town
- Interactive map of Sakaba
- Coordinates: 11°06′N 5°36′E
- Country: Nigeria
- State: Kebbi State
- Headquarter: Dirindaji

Government
  - Local Government Chairman: Alhaji Dauda Muhammad Sakaba

Area
  - Total: 1,392 km^{2} (537 sq mi)
- Elevation: 351 m (1,153 ft)

Population (2022 projection)
  - Total: 156,700
  - Density: 112.6/km^{2} (292/sq mi)
- Time zone: UTC+1 (WAT)
- Postal code: 872105

Sakaba is a town and one of the 21 Local Government Areas (LGAs) in Kebbi State, Nigeria. It's part of the Zuru Emirate and has its headquarters in Dirindaji. Sakaba became part of Kebbi State when it was created from Sokoto State on 27 August, 1991.

== Demographics ==
Sakaba has a population projection of approximately 156,700 people, with Hausa, Fulani, Dakarkari, Acipa, and Dukkawa being the dominant ethnic groups.

=== Education and health ===
Sakaba has a number of educational institutions, including primary and secondary schools, as well as a few tertiary institutions. Sakaba has a limited number of healthcare facilities, including a general hospital and a few primary healthcare centers.

== Economy ==
The economy of Sakaba is primarily driven by agriculture, with crops such as millet, sorghum, and cowpeas being major staples. Sakaba has a relatively underdeveloped infrastructure, with limited access to electricity, water, and healthcare facilities. It faces challenges such as poverty, limited infrastructure, insecurity, and environmental degradation.

== Climate ==
With an average yearly temperature of 32.68 °C (90.82 °F), Sakaba has a tropical wet and dry climate with a mix of grasslands and forests. Its climate is 3.22% warmer than the country's average.

Climate data for Sakaba
Month	Jan	Feb	Mar	Apr	May	Jun	Jul	Aug	Sep	Oct	Nov	Dec	Year
Record high °C (°F)	47.04 (116.67)	51.22 (124.20)	49.13 (120.43)	53.32 (127.98)	48.09 (118.56)	42.86 (109.15)	40.77 (105.39)	38.68 (101.62)	40.77 (105.39)	42.86 (109.15)	43.91 (111.04)	42.86 (109.15)	53.32 (127.98)
Mean daily maximum °C (°F)	39.07 (102.33)	41.86 (107.35)	43.48 (110.26)	43.15 (109.67)	40.12 (104.22)	37.22 (99.00)	33.98 (93.16)	31.77 (89.19)	33.34 (92.01)	37.13 (98.83)	39.46 (103.03)	38.26 (100.87)	38.24 (100.83)
Daily mean °C (°F)	30.89 (87.60)	33.8 (92.8)	36.34 (97.41)	37.21 (98.98)	35.56 (96.01)	33.11 (91.60)	30.27 (86.49)	28.53 (83.35)	29.68 (85.42)	32.37 (90.27)	33.31 (91.96)	31.05 (87.89)	32.68 (90.82)
Mean daily minimum °C (°F)	19.93 (67.87)	22.62 (72.72)	26.23 (79.21)	29.26 (84.67)	29.38 (84.88)	27.31 (81.16)	25.3 (77.5)	24.3 (75.7)	24.76 (76.57)	25.83 (78.49)	24.22 (75.60)	20.74 (69.33)	24.99 (76.98)
Record low °C (°F)	13.59 (56.46)	15.68 (60.22)	17.77 (63.99)	19.86 (67.75)	25.09 (77.16)	21.95 (71.51)	18.82 (65.88)	21.95 (71.51)	20.91 (69.64)	21.95 (71.51)	18.82 (65.88)	14.64 (58.35)	13.59 (56.46)
Average precipitation mm (inches)	0.3 (0.01)	0.55 (0.02)	5.12 (0.20)	25.31 (1.00)	78.98 (3.11)	99.19 (3.91)	177.93 (7.01)	291.8 (11.49)	157.97 (6.22)	37.93 (1.49)	0.0 (0.0)	0.0 (0.0)	72.93 (2.87)
Average precipitation days (≥ 1.0 mm)	0.09	0.09	1.33	4.28	11.78	11.5	19.67	24.33	19.1	6.65	0.0	0.0	8.24
Average relative humidity (%)	18.0	18.95	25.43	37.81	50.83	60.84	73.23	82.76	79.11	60.35	30.45	21.02	46.56
Source: Weather and Climate - The Global Historical Weather and Climate Data (2010-2020)
