= Kebbi boat disaster =

Boat crash on the Niger River

2021 Nigeria boat accident
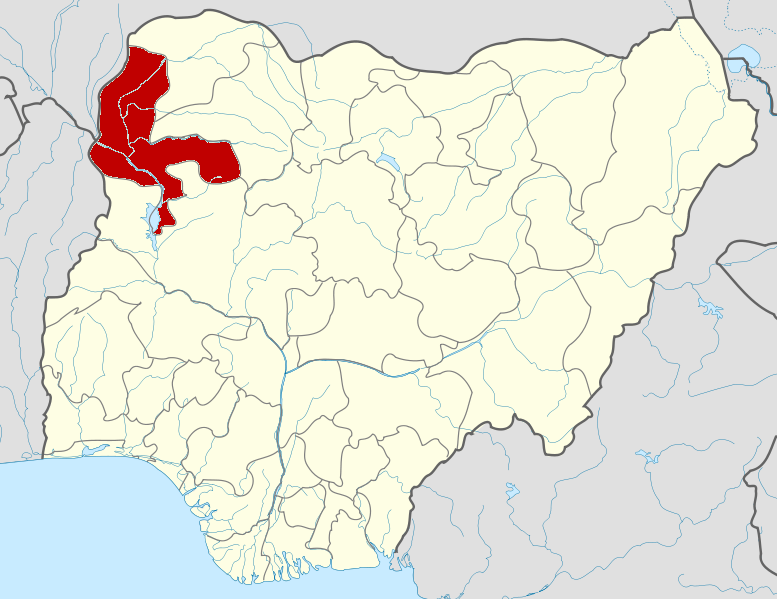
- Date: 26 May 2021
- Time: 8:15 am
- Location: Niger River near Warrah, Nigeria; 10.2°N 4.55°E
- Type: Shipwreck
- Cause: Collision with object
- Participants: Crew and passengers (150)
- Deaths: 98 bodies found, others remained missing

On 26 May 2021, an overloaded and overcrowded vessel carrying at least 160 passengers broke into two and sank after hitting an object in the Nigerian part of the Niger River. The boat was travelling between Niger State and Wara in Kebbi State when it sank. The incident left at least 98 dead.

== Background ==
Nigerian waterways have become increasingly dangerous in recent years, with various organizations estimating that between 150 and 350 deaths occurred in 2020 alone. In May 2021, 30 people died when a boat carrying 100 passengers hit a stump and broke in two in Niger State. In July 2020, another boat sank in Benue State with nearly 30 people on board, and seven people died when a boat sank amidst heavy rain near Lagos, followed by eight deaths in a separate boat incident a month later.

== Accident ==
On 26 May 2021, an overloaded boat carrying between 150 and 200 passengers departed from the village of Lokon Minna in central Niger State to a market in Warrah in Kebbi State on the other side of the Niger River. Between 8:15 am and 8:20 am, the boat struck an object in the river, which caused it to quickly break into two pieces and sink. Most of the passengers on board the boat were women and children who were travelling to Warrah to sell food at a market, as well as some miners.

The boat had picked up passengers at unregulated locations along the river as opposed to an official jetty, likely in order to evade taxes, and because of this the true number of passengers on board the boat was not known. The craft was an old wooden boat that had a capacity of between 80 and 150 passengers. In addition to the passengers, the boat was also carrying a cargo of sandbags from a gold mine.

Between 22 and 26 passengers were rescued shortly after the incident, followed by the recovery of 76 bodies. Marine Police, local fishermen, and divers were involved in the rescue and recovery operation. The remaining passengers were not found and were presumed dead.

== Aftermath ==
Nigerian president Muhammadu Buhari offered his condolences to the families of the victims.

Many Nigerian organizations donated funds for the families of the victims. The Nigerian Governors' Forum donated 50 million nairas to the families of the victims. The governor of Kebbi State, Abubakar Atiku Bagudu, promised 11 million nairas for the victims' families.

A number of organizations criticized the government over the increasing number of boat accidents, blaming it over a lack of enforcement of safety regulations. The president of the National Council of Managing Directors of Licensed Customs Agents suggested that the government should buy ferries in order to guarantee safety to the public. The Emir of Yauri, Muhammad Zayyanu, asked the government to dredge the Niger River to prevent similar accidents and ensure that every boat operator had life jackets for each passenger. The Association of Tourist Boat Operators and Water Transporters of Nigeria described the incident as a "national tragedy" and an "embarrassment to the nation" and called on the government to map and dredge rivers, and remove old wrecks.

Representing the government, the National Inland Waterways Authority blamed the operators of the ferry for overloading the boat and violating safety regulations. The authority promised to enforce safety regulations such as ensuring that boats have enough life jackets for each passenger on board and banning ferries from operating at night. On June 3, the NIWA announced a mandatory training course for all boat operators, granting the title of "certified captain" to those who complete the course. The governor of Kebbi State, Atiku Bagudu, promised to conduct a review of maritime laws in order to prevent future accidents. The Niger State police asked all boat operators to comply with safety regulations, including life jackets, and adhering to maximum boat capacities.
