= Zuru =

Town in Kebbi, Nigeria

Zuru Azuguru
- LGA and town
- Interactive map of Zuru
- Location in Nigeria
- Coordinates: 11.435°N 5.235°E
- Country: Nigeria
- State: Kebbi

Government
  - Gomo: Maj. Gen. Mohammed Sani Sami (rtd)
- Time zone: UTC+1 (WAT)

Zuru is a town and Local Government Area in Kebbi State, Nigeria. It is also the headquarters of Zuru Emirate. The Emirate comprises four local government areas, namely: Wasagu/Danko, Fakai, Sakaba and Zuru.

It has an area of 653 km^{2} (252 sq mi) and a population of 165,547 at the 2006 census.

The postal code of the area is 872.

== Climatic condition ==
The climate is hot and oppressive, with a year-round temperature range of 14 °C (58 °F) to 38 °C (100 °F), with occasional dips below or above 41 °C (105 °F).

=== Temperature ===
With warming stripes signifying the average annual temperature, climate change is significantly raising the temperature in Zuru.

== Topography ==
Zuru is located at geographical coordinates of 11.435 degrees latitude, 5.235 degrees longitude, and an elevation of 394 metres (1,293 feet).

The landscape within a 3-kilometre or 2-mile radius of Zuru exhibits relatively minor changes in elevation, with the most significant elevation difference measuring 126 metres (413 feet), and an average elevation above sea level of about 426 metres (1,398 feet). Expanding the radius to 16 kilometres or 10 miles continues to show only modest elevation variations, totaling 234 metres (768 feet). However, when considering a 80-kilometre or 50-mile radius, the terrain displays notable fluctuations in elevation, amounting to 513 metres (1,683 feet).

The region within a 3-kilometre or 2-mile radius of Zuru is characterized by cropland (66%), trees (14%), and grassland (13%). Extending the scope to a 16-kilometre or 10-mile radius reveals a landscape primarily consisting of cropland (77%) and shrubs (10%). When looking at a 80-kilometre or 50-mile radius, cropland covers 68% of the area, with grassland making up 12% of the land cover.

== Districts ==
- Bedi
- Zodi
- Tadurga
- Seme
- Senchi
- Ciroman
- Dabai
- Isgogo
- Dago Manga
- Ushe
- Rafin Zuru
- Rikoto
- Rumu
- Doben
