= Gol va Mol =

Gol va Mol گل ومل
- Village
- Location within Iran
- Coordinates: 33°14′35″N 52°05′56″E
- Country: Iran
- Province: Isfahan
- County: Ardestan
- Bakhsh: Central
- Rural District: Olya

Population (2006)
  - Total: 34
- Time zone: UTC+3:30 (IRST)
  - Summer (DST): UTC+4:30 (IRDT)

Gol va Mol (Persian: گل ومل, also known as Gol Mol, Golmol, and Golomel) is a village in Olya Rural District, in the Central District of Ardestan County, Isfahan Province, Iran. At the 2006 census, its population was 34, in 13 families.
