= Eastern Acipa language =

Kainji language of Nigeria

Eastern Acipa
- Zubazuba, Səgəmuk
- Native to: Nigeria
- Region: Niger State
- Ethnicity: Acipa
- Native speakers: (5,000 cited 1993)
- Language family: Niger–Congo?: Atlantic–Congo; Benue–Congo; Kainji; Kamuku; Eastern Acipa

Language codes
- ISO 639-3: acp
- Glottolog: east2403

Eastern Acipa (also known as Zubazuba or Səgəmuk) is a Kainji language of Nigeria. It is not close to the language of the same name to its west, though speakers of both are ethnic Acipa. It had 5,000 speakers in 1993. Speakers refer to their language as Tusəgəmuku.
