= 2021 Kebbi massacre =

- Location: Kebbi State, Nigeria
- Date: 3 June 2021
- Deaths: 90+
- Injuries: Unknown

On 3 June 2021, an armed group attacked eight villages in Kebbi State, northwestern Nigeria, killing at least 90 people. The attack began at 3 pm; the bandits, who rode motorcycles, attacked Koro, Kimpi, Gaya, Dimi, Zutu, Rafin Gora and Iguenge villages. The gunmen, from the neighbouring Nigerian states of Niger and Zamfara, also stole cattle and destroyed crops.

The governor of Kebbi State promised financial aid and "requested communities in the area to be tolerant, accommodating, friendly and peaceful".
