= Mariga, Nigeria =

Mariga
- LGA and town
- Interactive map of Mariga
- Location in Nigeria
- Coordinates: 10°42′N 5°50′E
- Country: Nigeria
- State: Niger State
- Headquarter: Bangi

Government
  - Local Government Chairman and the Head of the Local Government Council: Hon. Abbas Adamu Kasuwan Garba

Area
  - Total: 5,552 km^{2} (2,144 sq mi)

Population (2006 census)
  - Total: 199,430
  - Density: 35.92/km^{2} (93.03/sq mi)
- Time zone: UTC+1 (WAT)
- 3-digit postal code prefix: 922
- ISO 3166 code: NG.NI.MR

Mariga is a Local Government Area in Niger State, Nigeria. Its headquarters are in the town of Bangi in the north of the area. Other towns in the LGA are Igwama and Inkwai. Various endangered Kamuku languages are spoken in Mariga LGA.

It has an area of 5,552 km^{2} and a population of 199,430 at the 2006 census. Mariga is the commercial nerve center of northern part of Niger State and is the second largest Local Government in the state.

Mariga's economy is primarily based on agriculture and trade. Agriculture mainly consists of maize, groundnuts and guinea corn production. Mariga is a market town for the surrounding area, and is home to traders specializing in the buying and selling of cattle, as well as major crop exporters.

== People ==
The principal inhabitants of the city are the Kamuku people. The Hausa language is widely spoken in Mariga. Kambari languages are also spoken in the LGA. Mariga is a Hausa and Fulani dominated city that is largely Muslims. The majority of Mariga’s Muslims are Sunni. Christians and followers of other non-Muslim religions form a small part of the population.

== Climate ==
With an annual temperature of 32.13 °C (89.83 °F), 2.67% higher than the national average for Nigeria, the district of Mariga in that country has a tropical wet and dry climate.

== Transportation ==
Mariga is strategically located and owns its leading position as commercial hub in northern part of the state. Mariga is linked to many Local Government cities by road.

The postal code of the area is 922.

The LGA includes the Zugurma Game Reserve, a section of the Kainji National Park.
