= Dankade massacre =

Mass murder in Kebbi State, Nigeria

- Location: Dankade, Kebbi State, Nigeria
- Date: January 2022
- Target: civilians
- Attack type: massacre
- Deaths: 18-53
- Injuries: unknown
- Victim: civilians

In mid-January 2022, a bandit gang killed over 50 people in Dankade, (Note: Alternatively spelled Dan-Kade.) Kebbi State, Nigeria.

== Background ==
The Nigerian bandit conflict began in 2011, and has mostly taken place in northwestern Nigeria. Armed gangs have carried out many attacks, including mass kidnappings, robbery, arson and mass shootings. Hundreds of people have been killed and thousands displaced. The conflict escalated in the early 2020s; the largest and most deadly event being the massacres in Zamfara State in early January 2022. The Nigerian authorities, who are also opposing the Boko Haram insurgency and the insurgency in Southeastern Nigeria, have difficulty tackling the bandit gangs.

== Incident ==
On the evening of 14 January 2022, a group of bandits attacked Dankade, a village in Kebbi State, Northwest Nigeria. After a shootout with soldiers and police in which two soldiers and a police officer were killed, security forces retreated. The gang continued their assault into the early hours of the following day, killing numerous villagers, burning down shops and grain silos, as well as stealing cattle. The gang kidnapped villagers, including its community leader. By the time the bandits left dead bodies lay all over the streets of Dankade.

A survivor recalled:

“Many were killed and their corpses burnt. We can’t tell the number of fatalities right now. We are left wondering why terror killings seem to be on the rise, particularly in the North-West region.”

State authorities put the casualty number at 18, while some locals said the bandits had killed over 50 civilians.
