= 2021 Kebbi kidnapping =

On June 17, 2021, at 10:00am, over 80 students and staff were kidnapped at the Federal Government College Birnin Yauri, located in Kebbi, Nigeria. The van used in the crime scene to travel the students under kidnapping belonged to a former judge. A policeman at the school securing was killed; an estimated 80 students and 5 teachers were initially abducted.
