= Kebbi State =

State of Nigeria

Kebbi
- State
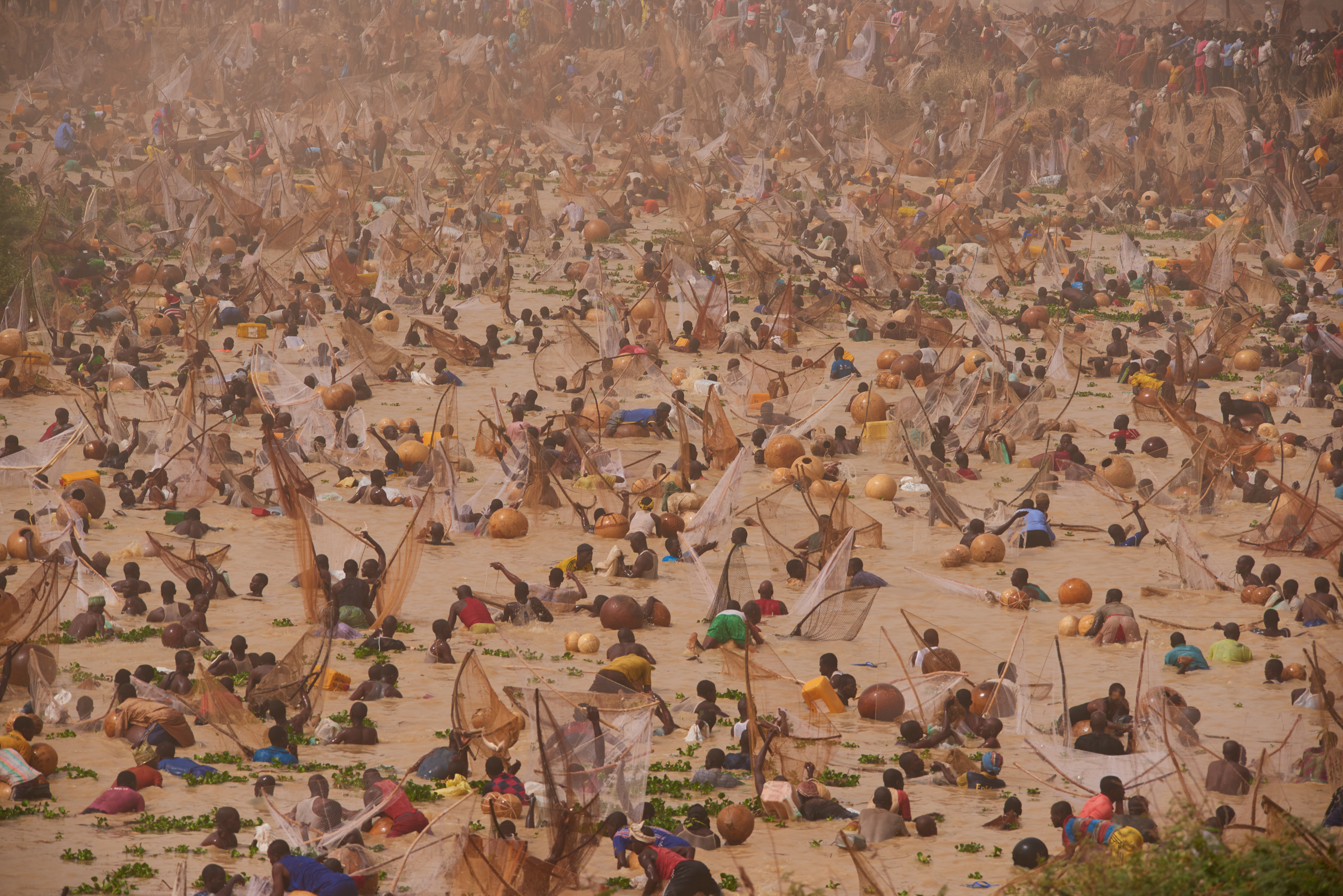
- Image showing the yearly Argungu Fishing Festival held in Argungu

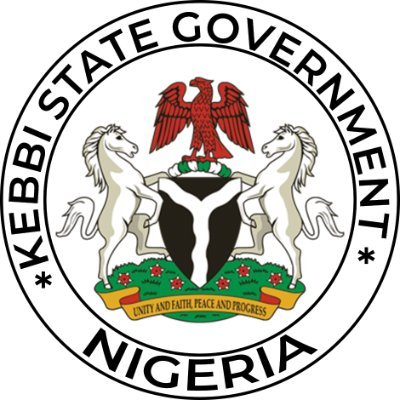
- Seal
- Nicknames: Land of Equity
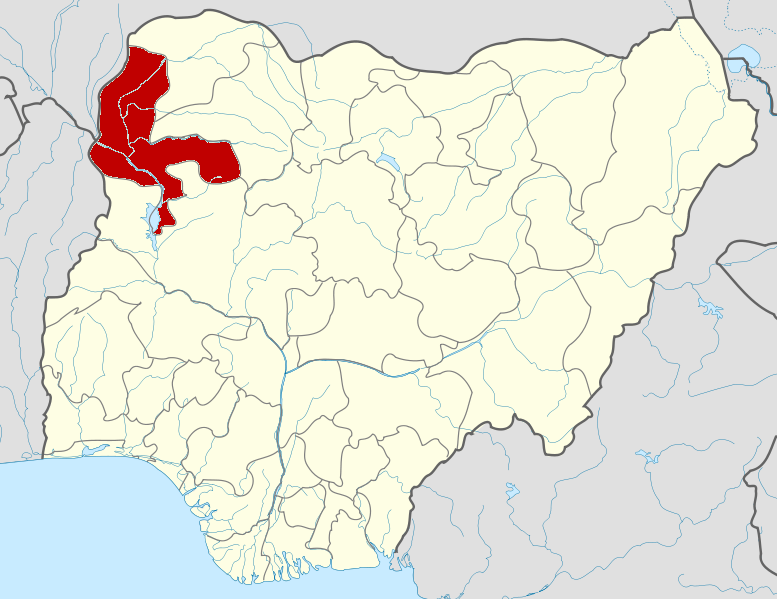
- Location of Kebbi State in Nigeria
- Coordinates: 11°30′N 4°00′E
- Country: Nigeria
- LGAs: 21
- Date created: 27 August 1991
- Capital: Birnin Kebbi

Government
  - Body: Government of Kebbi State
  - Governor (List): Nasir Idris (APC)
  - Deputy Governor: Abubakar Umar Argungu (APC)
  - Legislature: Kebbi State House of Assembly
  - Senators: C: Adamu Aliero (APC); N: Yahaya Abdullahi (APC); S: Garba Musa Maidoki (PDP)
  - Representatives: List

Area
  - Total: 36,800 km^{2} (14,200 sq mi)
  - Rank: 10th of 36

Population (2006 census)
  - Total: 3,256,541
  - Estimate (2022): 5,563,900
  - Rank: 22nd of 36
  - Density: 88.5/km^{2} (229/sq mi)
- Demonym: Kebbian

GDP (PPP)
  - Year: 2023
  - Total: $16.6 billion 31st of 36
  - Per capita: $2,900; 28th of 36
- Time zone: UTC+01 (WAT)
- postal code: 860001
- ISO 3166 code: NG-KE
- HDI (2022): 0.366 low · 37th of 37
- Website: kebbistate.gov.ng

Kebbi State (Hausa: Jihar Kebbi; Fulfulde: Leydi Kebbi 𞤤𞤫𞤴𞤣𞤭 𞤳𞤫𞤦𞥆𞤭) is a state in northwestern Nigeria, bordered to the east and north by the states of Sokoto and Zamfara, and to the south by Niger State while its western border forms part of the national borders with Benin Republic and Niger. Named for the city of Birnin Kebbi—the state's capital and largest city—Kebbi State was formed from a part of Sokoto State on 27 August 1991. Of the 36 states of Nigeria, Kebbi is the tenth largest in area and 17th most populous with an estimated population of about 6 million as of 2023.

Geographically, the state is within the tropical West Sudanian savanna ecoregion. Important geographic features include the Sokoto River which flows through Kebbi into the River Niger, which continues south before reaching Kainji Lake. Among the state's nature are a number of fish species exhibited during the massive Argungu Fishing Festival along with hippopotamus, West African manatee, and transient African bush elephant populations.

Ethnically, Kebbi is inhabited by various ethnic groups, with the Fulani, Hausa, and Zarma peoples living throughout the state while the Achipa (Achipawa), Boko-Bala, Dendi, Dukawa, Kambari, Kamuku, Lela, Puku, and Shanga peoples live along the state's diverse western and southern borders. Religiously, the majority of the state's population (~84%) are Muslims while the remaining are followers of Christianity and traditional religions like Bori.

In the pre-colonial period, the area that is now Kebbi State was mainly controlled by the Kebbi Kingdom, a Hausa Banza bakwai state, until the early 1800s when Fulani jihadists seized part of the area and attempted to incorporate it into the Gwandu Emirate under the Sokoto Caliphate. Over the next century, Kebbi rulers fought Sokoto on-and-off until the 1900s and 1910s, when the British seized control of the area as a part of the Northern Nigeria Protectorate which later merged into British Nigeria before becoming independent as Nigeria in 1960. Originally, modern-day Kebbi State was a part of the post-independence Northern Region until 1967 when the region was split and the area became part of the North-Western State. After the North-Western State was split, Sokoto State was formed in 1976 alongside ten other states. Twenty years afterward, a group of LGAs in Sokoto State's west and south was broken off to form the new Kebbi State.

Economically, Kebbi State is largely based around fishing and agriculture, mainly of sorghum, groundnuts, millet, onions, and rice crops. Other key industries are trading, especially in the city of Birnin Kebbi, and the livestock herding of camels, cattle, goats, and sheep. Kebbi has the lowest Human Development Index and sixth lowest GDP in the country.

== History ==
Kebbi state is traditionally considered by Sarki mythology as the homeland of the ƴan uwa bakwai states and Hausa kingdoms.

Kebbi resisted the Fulani jihad of the early 19th-century, but in the later 19th-century, the area largely converted to Islam through peaceful means.

== History of Zuru ==
Zuru emirate is divided into five administrative chiefdoms: Dabai, Danko, Fakai, Sakaba, and Wasagu. The third class chief, who is also member of the Zuru town in Dabai chiefdom, where the emirate headquarters is located, heads each of the towns. Zuru Emirate is located in the southern part of Kebbi state Nigeria, occupying an area of about 9000 sq km. It is bordered by Gummi in Zamfara state in the North. To the south is Niger state, this borderline extends also arbitrarily on land to the west, to a point where it ends a few kilometers to the west of large tributary of the Dan Zari River, a northwest ward protrusion of Yauri Emirate of Kebbi.

In fact, going by history, Zuru people being multi-ethnic are grouped into categories. The first category is of those that claim long term settlement and the second category is of the much more recent settlers, who in fact regard themselves – and are also regarded by the others as recent immigrants or even as temporary strangers. In the first category are the Achifawa, Kambari, Dukkawa Fakkawa,'Dankawa, Worawa, Katsinawa and Lelna (Dakarkari' such as sindawa').

It is characteristic to find that some of them lay claim to have originated from the Hausas. Zuru as was said, is a result of upheaval, resulting from events such as Kanta's breakaway from Songhai and Nupe-Kororofa control. Moreover, the Katsinawa, who in fact see themselves as immigrants from the old state of Katsina, which had made political in road Zuru region, especially from the 16th century A.D. onward, and had enabled them to settle and to area's indigenous population.

== Geography ==
Kebbi state was created out of the former Sokoto state on 17 August 1991. The state has a total population of 3,137,989 people as projected from the 1991 census, within 21 local government areas.

The state has Sudan and Sahel-savannah. The southern part is generally rocky with the Niger River traversing the state from Benin to Ngaski LGA. The northern part of the state is sandy with the Rima River passing through Argungu to Bagudo LGA, where it empties into the Niger. Agriculture is the main occupation of the people, especially in the rural areas. Crops produced are mainly grains. Animal rearing and fishing are also common. Christianity and Islam are the dominant religions of the people. There are 225 political wards, 3,000 settlements and 1,036 hard to reach settlements in the 21 local government areas in the state.

=== Climate ===
Like other Nigerian states, Kebbi state is also characterised with the tropical weather conditions of coldness, wetness and harmattan. The annual rainfall of Kebbi state has the average of 787.53 and 112.21 millimetres (31.005 and 4.418 inches), since rainfall is a climatic resource in the state, which aids agricultural production. The rainy season in the state is between mid-May and mid-September, while the dry season constitutes a period of seven months. The temperature of Kebbi state has an annual variation between 18 °C (64 °F) and 40 °C (104 °F). The cloud of Kebbi state is clearer around November to March of the succeeding month, while the state is usually cloudy between March and November at 68% annually. There is a relatively high humidity between seven months, April and November of every year, with November to July being the windiest.

== Local Government Areas ==
Kebbi state consists of 21 Local Government Areas (LGAs), four emirate councils (Gwandu, Argungu, Yauri and Zuru), and 35 districts. The LGAs are as follows:

- Aleiro
- Arewa Dandi
- Argungu
- Augie
- Bagudo
- Birnin Kebbi
- Bunza
- Dandi
- Fakai
- Gwandu
- Jega
- Kalgo
- Koko/Besse
- Maiyama
- Ngaski
- Sakaba
- Shanga
- Suru
- Wasagu
- Yauri
- Zuru

== Demographics ==
Kebbi state is mainly populated by Hausa and Fulani people. with some members of Zarma, Lelna (Dakarkari), Bussawa (generally speakers of Busa), Dukawa, Kambari, Gungawa and Kamuku ethnic communities. Most people who live in Kebbi are Muslims.

== Languages ==
The Hausa language is dominant throughout the State. Below is a list of some languages of Kebbi state listed by LGA:

LGA	Languages
Argungu	Dendi; Zarma
Bagudo	Bisã; Boko; Dendi; Kyenga
Birnin Kebbi	Zarma
Bunza	Zarma
Donko-Wasagu	C'Lela
Dukku	us-Saare
Jega	Gibanawa
Ngaski	Cishingini; Lopa; Tsikimba; Tsishingini; Tsucuba; Tsuvadi
Sakaba	Cicipu; C'Lela; Damakawa; ut-Ma'in
Shanga	Shanga
Wasagu-Danko	us-Saare; Gwamhi-Wuri
Yauri	Reshe; us-Saare
Zuru	C'Lela; ut-Ma'in

Other languages spoken in Kebbi state include Fulfulde, Ut-Hun, and Sorko.

== Government ==
Like the majority of Nigerian states, Kebbi state is governed by a governor and a State House of Assembly, under the current administration of Nasir Idris.

== Agriculture ==
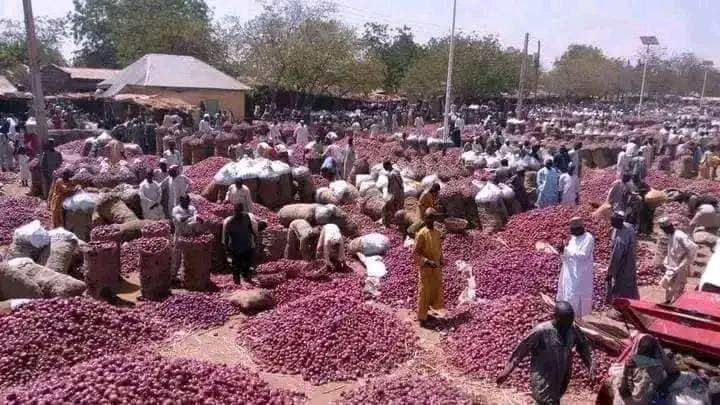
Aliero Onion Market, Kebbi State

Kebbi state is one of the major producers of rice in Nigeria. The current participation of more than 70,000 farmers in the Anchor Borrowers Rice and wheat farming, is heading towards making Kebbi state a new destination and hub for agro-based commodities of the country.

To reiterate his commitment to ensure that Kebbi state is not only dependent on federal government allocation, the active governor of the state, Abubakar Atiku Bagudu paid a visit to Benin Republic last year and while on the trip, signed a number of bilateral trade protocols with the government and business community of Benin Republic with a view to fostering trade, industrial and tourism relationships with the country.

Abubakar Atiku Bagudu is also the Chairman, National Task Force on Rice and Wheat Production in Nigeria.

== Tertiary learning institutions ==
The tertiary institutions of learning in Kebbi state, both federal government owned, state owned and private institutions are listed this:

- Federal University, Birnin kebbi
- Federal University of Agriculture, Zuru
- Kebbi State University of Science and Technology, Aliero
- Waziri Umaru Federal Polytechnic Birnin Kebbi
- Kebbi State Polytechnic Dakin Gari
- Adamu Augie College of Education, Argungu
- Kebbi State College of Nursing and Midwives Birnin Kebbi.
- Kebbi State College of Health Sciences and Technology, Jega
- Kebbi State College of Basic and Advance Studies, Yauri
- Sajo College of Nursing Sciences, Birnin Kebbi

== Transport ==
=== Federal highways ===
A1 north from Niger State at Makirin via Yelwa, Koko, Sokoto State for 19 km from Tungan Ilo via Kuchi in Kebbe LGA to Maishaika, Jega, Sokoto State again for nine km from Illela via Tambawel in Kebbe LGA to Ungan-Bawa, and northeast to Sokoto State at Barkeji.

=== Road to Niger ===
Southwest from Bunza at Kamba to RN8.

=== Other major roads ===
- the Birnin-Kebbi-Anmawa Rd northwest from A1 at Jega to Kalgo,
- the Birnin-Kebbu-Anmawa Rd north from Kalgo via Birnin Kebbi and Zauro to Argungu as the Birnin Kebbi-Argungu Rd,
- the Dagawa-Argungu Rd east to Sokoto State near Fakwon Sarki as the Arugungu-Iyabo-Sokoto Rd,
- the Maidahin-Daringari-Kalgo Junction Rd south from Kalgo to Bunza,
- the Dakingari-Bunza Rd south from Bunza via Dakingari and Zagga,
- the Bin Yauri-Rijau Rd east from A1 at Bin Yauri via Birnin Yauri and Gwanda to Niger State at Kambuwa as the Maburo Rijau Rd,
- the Fakai-Iri-Rijau Rd north from Niger State via Bajida,
- the Zuru-Mahuta Rd east from Fakai to Dabai, where one branch goes north via Donko to Zamfara State, and another branch goes south to Niger State as the Rijau-Zuru Rd.

=== Airports ===
- Sir Ahmadu Bello International at Birnin Kebbi with regular flights to Lagos and Abuja, with Muslim pilgrims to Saudi Arabia during the Haji
- Tuga Airstrip near Bagudo.

== Natural resources ==
Kebbi state has many natural resources which boost the economy of the state and enhances the availability of raw materials for industrial purposes, these include:

- Gold
- Clay
- Quartz
- Magnesite
- Manganese
- Iron
- Copper
- Aluminium

== Major incidents ==
- Kebbi boat disaster on 26 May 2021.

=== Bandit attacks ===
Kebbi state is badly affected by the Nigerian bandit conflict. Banditry attacks in the state include the 2021 Kebbi massacre on 3 June 2021, the Kebbi kidnapping on 24 June 2021, the Dankade massacre on 14-15 January 2022 and the 2022 Kebbi massacres on 8 March of the same year.

On 17 November 2025, unidentified gunmen killed the vice principal of a secondary school and kidnapped 25 female students in Maga town.

== See also ==
- Kebbi Emirate
- Argungu Fishing Festival

== Bibliography ==
- Blench, Roger. 2020. Kebbi State: cultural briefing.
- Harris, P. G.: Sokoto Provincial Gazetteer, Sokoto 1938 [Cyclostyled].
- Hogben, S. J. and A. H. M. Kirk-Greene: The Emirates of Northern Nigeria, London 1966.
- Lange, Dierk: "An Assyrian successor state in West Africa: The ancestral kings of Kebbi as ancient Near Eastern rulers", Anthropos, 104, 2 (2009), 359–382.
