= Kamuku people =

Ethnic group in Nigeria

The Kamuku are an ethnic group in central Nigeria. The Kamuku language belongs to the Kainji family and is related to C'lela, Duka, and Kambari. They mainly live in the west-central region of Nigeria, particularly in Kwara State. Their population in 1996 exceeded 35,000 people, found in the Sokoto division of Sokoto State, the Birnin Gwari division of Kaduna State and the Kontagora and Minna divisions of Niger State.

The Kamuku may have been the dominant people of the kingdom of Kankuma (also Kwangoma or Kangoma), a people whom Al-Makrizi (d.1442) called Karuku in his book The Races of the Sudan. One historian speculates that Kankuma may have been the precursor to the Hausa state of Zazzau. The Gazetteers of the Northern Provinces of Nigeria: The Central Kingdoms, published in the early 1920s, described the Kamuku people as industrious agriculturalists who keep livestock, are of a somewhat timid and retiring nature and are thoroughly amenable to authority. They did not seem to recognize a central authority above the level of a village head. The Kamuku share some customs with the neighboring Gwari people, such as shaking peas in a tortoise shell and drawing marks according to the result so as to divine the future.
