= Damakawa language =

Nigerian language

Damakawa
- Tidama'un
- Native to: Nigeria
- Region: Kebbi State
- Ethnicity: 500–1,000 Damakawa (2008)
- Extinct: 20th century
- Language family: Niger–Congo?: Atlantic–Congo; Benue–Congo; Kainji; Northwest Kainji; Damakawa

Language codes
- ISO 639-3: dam
- Glottolog: dama1268
- ELP: Damakawa

Damakawa is a moribund Benue–Congo language of northwest Nigeria. The language has become extinct, there are no longer any speakers of the language, although the oldest people can remember a few words. Approximately 80 or so words and phrases were collected, with difficulty, in April 2008 (the language seems to have been unknown to linguists until then).

The Damakawa have shifted to the nearby larger language C'Lela and it is likely that all or almost all of them also speak the lingua franca Hausa. The Hausa name for the ethnic group is also Damakawa.

== Classification ==
Based on such a small amount of data of uncertain reliability, it is hard to classify Damakawa precisely. It is probably best placed in the Northwest Kainji branch of Benue–Congo. The words that have been collected show similarities with both C'Lela and Kambari languages, and it may be that the Kambari words are loans or mis-rememberings.

== Alternative names ==
The nearby Cicipu speakers call the Damakawa language "Tidama'un". In the trade language Hausa the expected name for the language would be Damakanci, given the people are called Damakawa. However Damakawa seems to be preferred by the Damakawa themselves, as far as can be ascertained.

== Geographic distribution ==
The Damakawa people probably number about 500-1000, and live in three or four villages near Maganda in Sakaba Local Government Area, Kebbi State.
