= Hungworo language =

Kainji language spoken in Nigeria

Hungworo
- Ngwe
- Ca̱hungwa̱rya̱
- Native to: Nigeria
- Region: Niger State
- Native speakers: 20,000 (2003)
- Language family: Niger–Congo?: Atlantic–Congo; Benue–Congo; Kainji; Kamuku; Hungworo

Language codes
- ISO 639-3: nat
- Glottolog: hung1276
- ELP: Hungworo

Huŋgwəryə
- Person: Buhungwəryə
- People: Əhungwəryə
- Language: ʨəhungwə̀ryə or Ca̱hungwa̱rya̱

Hungworo (Huŋgwəryə, Ca̱hungwa̱rya̱), or Ngwe (Ngwoi, Ungwai), is a Kainji language spoken in the Tegina, Kagara, Pandogari area of Rafi, Nigeria.

== Clans ==
Hungwəryə clans and their respective names and languages:

Clan	Language	Person (sg.)	People (pl.)	Hausa name
kùbìt	cìkùbìt	bùbítúbìtù	à-	Kabitu
kə́lə́kù	cìkə́lə́kù	bùlə́kúlə̀kù	à-	Karaku
ə̀yìnyə̀	cìyìnyə̀	bùyínyə́yìnyə̀	à-	Makangara
ùwũ̀sã̀	cìwũ̀sã̀	bùwṹsã́wũ̀sã̀	à-	Karaya
tə́mbə̀rì	cìtə́mbə̀rì	bùtə́mbə̀rì	à-	Tambari
gàdà	cìgádágàdà	bùgádágàdà	à-	Makangada

The Makangara clan is in Sàgòmyè, Àrìyà, Ə̀rwàkò, Ìgádá, Àzwàngò, Àtáʔèngè, Àságànà, and Kátùngà villages. The Karaku clan lives in Mùtə́kùcì and other villages.
