= Borgu (local government area) =

- Local Government Area
- Interactive map of Borgu
- Location in Nigeria
- Coordinates: 9°53′N 4°31′E
- Country: Nigeria
- State: Niger State
- Headquarter: New Bussa

Government
  - Local Government Chairman and the Head of the Local Government Council: Hon. Yarima Kilishi Sulayman
  - Emir (Mai Borgu): Bar. Dr. Alh. Muhammad Sani Haliru Dantoro Kitoro IV

Area
  - Total: 10,992 km^{2} (4,244 sq mi)

Population (2022 est)
  - Total: 296,500
  - Density: 26.97/km^{2} (69.86/sq mi)
- Time zone: UTC+1 (WAT)
- 3-digit postal code prefix: 913

The Borgu Local Government Area is an administrative region in Niger State, Nigeria, It is one of the 25 Local Government Areas (LGAs) in the state, with the headquarter situated in the town of New Bussa. The postal code is 913. The Borgu LGA was formerly part of Kwara State, but on 27 August 1991 it was transferred to Niger State.

The LGA has the same extent as the Borgu Emirate, a Nigerian traditional state. It contains part of the Borgu Game Reserve, a section of the Kainji National Park.

In the 1991 census Borgu LGA had a total population of 110,000, with a mixed ethnic population as follows:

- Fulani 30,000
- Bokobaru 25,000
- Busa 15,000
- Hausa 10,000
- kambari (Acipu) 8,000
- Yoruba 7,000
- Laru 5,000
- Hun-Saare 3,000
- Nupe 2,000
- Lopa 2,000
- Igbo 1,000
- Others 2,000

== Climate/Geography ==
The dry and wet seasons are the two main ones in Borgu Local Government Area. Borgu Local Government Area has an average humidity of 38% and an average wind speed of 13 km/h (8.1 mph). The region's average temperature is 30 degrees Celsius (86 degrees Fahrenheit).
