= Kagara Emirate =

Traditional state in Nigeria

- Traditional state
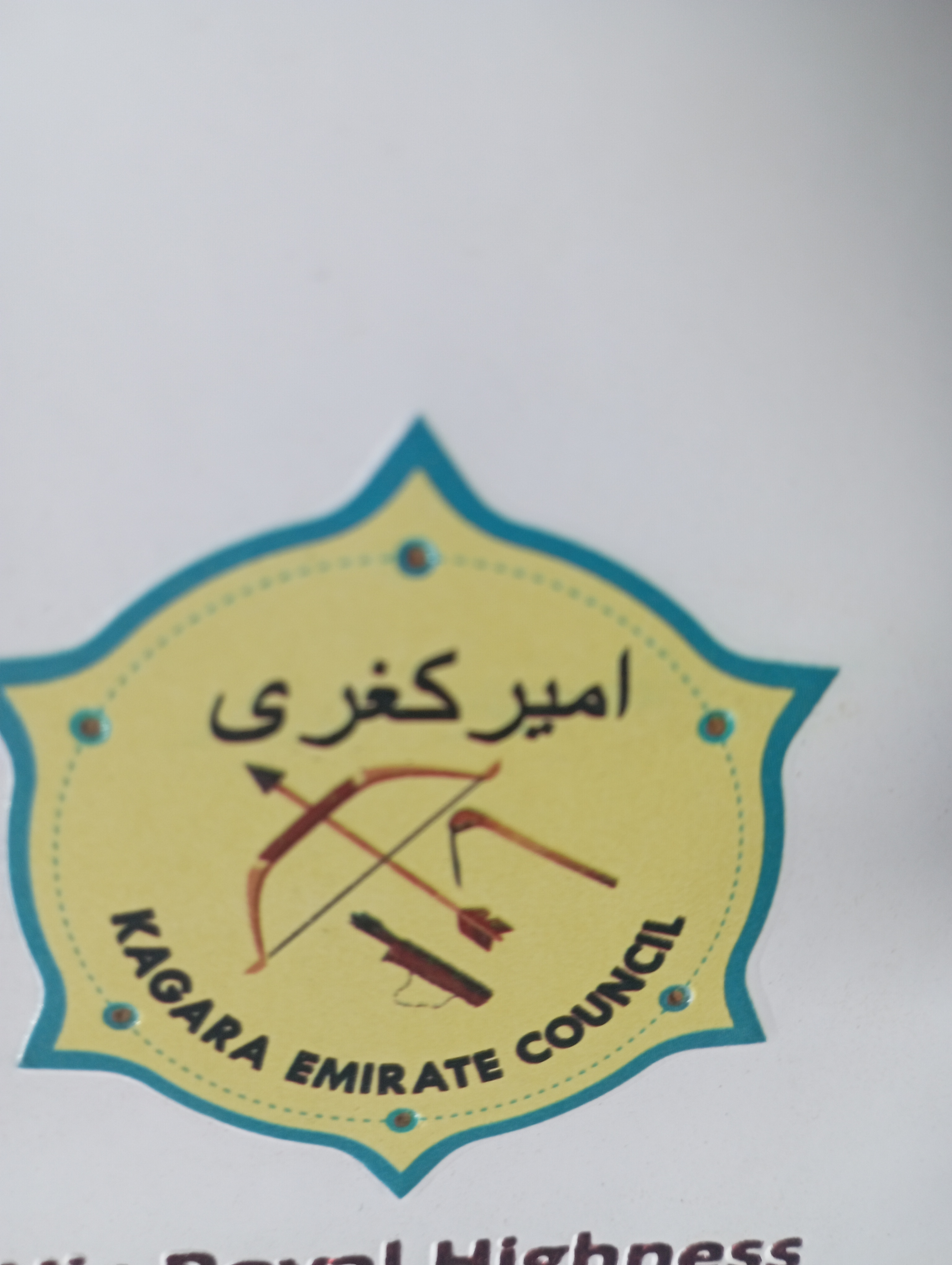
- Seal
- Motto(s): Home of peace and tourism
- Location in Nigeria
- Coordinates: 10°11′04″N 6°15′12″E
- Country: Nigeria
- State: Niger State

Government
  - Type: Emirate
  - Emir of Kagara: Alhaji Ahmad Garba Gunna II
- Time zone: UTC+1 (WAT)

The Kagara Emirate is a traditional state located in Kagara near Birnin-Gwari town, founded by the Nagwamatse of Kontagora through Madaki Masoyi. Kagara is the capital of Rafi local government Niger State, Nigeria. The emirate is located in Niger East Senatorial District. For administrative purpose aftermath of Dasuki reform of 1976, the emirate is composed of Tegina, Kusharki, Kwangoma, Gunna and later additional districts were created in 1991, thus: Uregi, Kagara, Katunga, Madaka Majajan and Ringa districts.

The Kagara Emirate is a traditional state with a first-class stool, currently held by Alhaji Ahmad Garba Gunna. Notably, the paramount chief of the emirate is a member of the Bassa people indicating that the Bassa have a significant traditional heritage in Kagara, the headquarters of Rafi Local Government Area in Nigeria.

== Rulers ==
Emirs of Kagara
No.	Name	Reign start	Reign end
1	Ahmadu Attahiru		
2	Alhaji Salihu Tanko	?	2 March 2021
3	Alhaji Ahmad Garba Gunna	7 April 2021	to date

Kagara Emirate came about after the Dasuki reform of local government in 1976. Since then it has had three rulers including the second emir of Kagara, Alhaji Salihu Tanko, who died after suffering from illness. Alhaji Ahmed Garba Gunna became the third emir of Kagara.

== History ==
The town has a talc processing plant.

Construction of a dam was initiated in 1979 for a sum of N5 billion. The Federal University of Technology Minna carried out the environmental impact assessment for the Upper Niger River Basin and Rural Development Authority (UNRBDA). About N3 billion had been paid by February 2002, when the Minister of Water Resources, Muktar Shagari, gave the contractor a deadline to complete the dam by December that year. In February 2004 the Minister of State for Water Resources, Bashr Ishola Awotorebo, visited the dam site, and as a result called the contractor to account for delays in the project. In August 2004, while presenting 500 hand pumps from the Federal Government to the Niger State Governor, Abdulkadir Kure, Mukhtar Shagari said the dam project could be doomed due to non-approval of the budgetary allocation. In August 2007, Bala Kuta of the All Nigeria Peoples Party, a National House of Assembly representative, pledged to help with the dam project.

One student was killed and 27 students, three teachers, twelve family members were kidnapped by bandits on 17 February 2021.

Remains of the Iron Age Nok culture have been found at Kagara, which lies at the far northwest end of the zone of Nok culture.
