= Kainji languages =

Subfamily of Benue–Congo languages of west-central Nigeria

Kainji
- Geographic distribution: Kainji Lake, Nigeria
- Linguistic classification: Niger–Congo?: Atlantic–Congo; Volta-Congo; Benue–Congo; Central Nigerian?; Kainji
- Subdivisions: Lake; core Kainji

Language codes
- Glottolog: kain1275
- The Kainji languages shown within the Middle Belt of central Nigeria

The Kainji languages are a group of about 60 related languages spoken in west-central Nigeria. They may be an independent branch of Benue–Congo.

== Demographics ==
Four of the most widely spoken Kainji languages are Tsuvadi (150,000), Cishingini and Tsishingini (100,000 each)—all from the Kambari branch; and Clela (C'lela, Lela) (100,000), of the Northwest Kainji branch. In total, there were about one million speakers of Kainji languages (1990s estimate) in Nigeria.

== History ==
Proto-Kainji is estimated by Blench (2012) to be 3,000 to 4,000 years old. Its broken distribution today is likely due to the historical northward expansion of the Nupoid languages.

== Morphology ==
Proto-Kainji nominal prefixes:

- *mV- for liquids and other mass nouns
- *u- for person, *ba- for people
- *kV- for diminutive and perhaps also augmentative; also found in some Plateau languages

== Classification ==
The most divergent of the Kainji languages are Reshe, Laru and Lopa, which may form a branch together. Subclassification of the other branches is not yet clear. A bipartite division between East Kainji and West Kainji is no longer maintained, with West Kainji now being paraphyletic.

=== Blench (2018) ===
Most recent Kainji classification by Blench (2018:64):

- Kainji
  - Lake
    - Reshe
    - Upper Niger
      - Rop
      - Shen, Shuba
  - Central
    - Northwest Kainji
    - Kambari, Cicipu
    - East Kainji
    - Kamuku, Shiroro, Basa

=== Blench (2012) ===
Blench's (2012) classification is:

- Kainji
  - Lakes: Reshe; Laru (Shen), Lopa (Rerang)
  - Kainji proper (Central)
    - Northwest Kainji (Lela)
      - Kambari, Cicipu
      - Basa, East Kainji
      - Kamuku, Shiroro

=== McGill (2012) ===
A revised classification of the Kainji languages by McGill (2012) splits Kainji into the Lake and Central branches.

- Kainji
  - Lake
    - Reshe
    - Upper Niger
      - Sengwe/Laru
      - Oleran/Lopa: Rop, Cuba
  - Central
    - Basa, Eastern
    - Northwest
      - Damakawa
      - C'lela
      - Hun-Saare/Duka; Wuri-Gwamhi-Mba, Ma'in/Fakai
    - Kambari
      - Cicipu
      - West: Gaushi/Auna, Kimba, Wunci/Agwara
      - East: Shingini/Salka, Va'di, Bangi
    - Nuclear
      - Shiroro
        - Bauchi: Mun-Wayam, Rubo-Supana
        - Gurmana
        - Rin/Pongu, Waga
        - Fungwa/Ura
      - Kamuku-Hunwarya/Ngwoi
        - Hunwarya/Ngwoi
        - Kamuku
          - Regi-Cinda-Kuki
          - Rogo-Shiyabe, Zubazuba-East Acipa
          - Shama

=== Gerhardt (1983) ===
Classification of Plateau 1a (now West Kainji) and Plateau 1b (now East Kainji) languages by Gerhardt (1983), based on Maddieson (1972):

- Plateau 1a
  - Laru-Lopa
  - Reshe
  - Kambari cluster
  - Ngwoi, Kamuku cluster, Bassa-Kontagora, Ashaganna
  - Bassa-Kaduna, Bassa-Kuta, Gurmana, Pongo, Baushi, Ura, Bassa-Kwomu
  - Dakarkari, Duka, Pəku-Kəri-Wipsi cluster, Lyase
- Plateau 1b
  - Kuda-Chamo, Butu-Ningi, Gyema, Taura, Lemoro-Sanga, Janji, Shani, Buji-Ibunu-Jere-Gus, Anaguta
  - Kuzamaini, Kurama, Rumaya, Ruruma, Binawa, Kono, Surubu
  - Kaivi, Kiballo, Kitimi, Kinuku, Dungi, Gure-Kahugu
  - Amo

== Names and locations ==
Below is a comprehensive list of Kainji language names, populations, and locations from Blench (2019).

Note: West Kainji is geographical rather than genealogical.

Distributions of Kainji groups
Group	Primary locations
East Kainji	Kauru LGA, Kaduna State and Bassa LGA, Plateau State
West Kainji	Rafi LGA, Niger State and Zuru and Yauri LGAs, Kebbi State (Kainji Lake area)

=== West Kainji ===
Language	Branch	Cluster	Dialects	Alternate spellings	Own name for language	Endonym(s)	Other names (location-based)	Other names for language	Exonym(s)	Speakers	Location(s)	Notes
Hɨpɨna	Baushi			Supana	Tihɨpɨna	Vihɨpɨna pl. Ahɨpɨna					Niger State, Rafi LGA, Supana town	
Mɨn	Baushi				Tiimɨn	Vʷinyi Mɨn pl. Ayi Mɨn	Bauchi Guda, Kukoki (name of largest town)				Niger State, Rafi LGA, 27 villages in 8 chiefships	
Ndәkә	Baushi		Shena may be a dialect	Madaka	Tundәkә	Vundәkә pl. Andәka					Niger State, Rafi LGA, Madaka town	
Rubu	Baushi										Niger State, Rafi LGA, Rubu town	
Wãyã	Baushi			Wayam	Tũwãyã	Vũwãyã pl. Ãwãyã					Niger State, Rafi and Shiroro LGAs, Wayam town	
Samburu	Baushi										Niger State, Rafi LGA, Samburu town	no data
Gurmana	Eastern									estimated more than 3,000 (1989)	Niger State, Shiroro LGA. Gurmana town and nearby hamlets	
Cipu	Kambari		Kumbashi, Tikula, Ticihun, Tirisino, Tidipo, Tizoriyo, Tiddodimo		Cicipu	Tocipu	Acipa, Achipa, Achipawa, Atsipawa	Tәcәp Tochipo Tә–Sәgәmuk	Bucepo sg., Ucɛpo pl. Bu–Sәgәmuk sg.	3,600 (1949 G&C)	Kebbi State, Sakaba LGA; Niger State, Mariga and Rafi LGA, Kaduna State Birnin Gwari LGA	
Damakawa (extinct)	Kambari			Damakawa					Tidama’un (Cicipu name)	500-1000 ethnic population, but language now has only a few rememberers	Kebbi State, Sakaba LGA, villages of Inguwar Kilo and Marandu	The dubious reliability of some of the data and the possibility of Cipu loans makes the classification of Damakawa slightly uncertain.
Kambari I cluster	Kambari	Kambari I		Kamberi						with Kambari II: 67,000 (1952 W&B); 100,000 (1973 SIL)	Niger State, Magama and Mariga LGAs; Kebbi State, Zuru and Yauri LGAs; Niger State, Borgu LGA	
Agaɗi	Kambari	Kambari I			Tsɨgaɗi		Kakihum				Niger State, Mariga LGA	
Avaɗi	Kambari	Kambari I		Abadi, Evadi	Tsɨvaɗi		Ibeto				Niger State, Magama LGA	
Baangi	Kambari	Kambari I		Baangi	ciBaangi	sg. vuBaangi, pl. aBaangi		Bangawa (Hausa)		estimate more than 5,000 (1989)	Niger State, Kontagora LGA, Ukata town and nearby villages; probably also into adjacent Kebbi State, Yauri LGA	
Tsishingini	Kambari	Kambari I			Cishingini, Tsishingini	Mashingini pl. Ashingini	Salka				Niger State, Magama LGA	
Yumu	Kambari	Kambari I			Yumu, Osisi						Niger State, Borgu LGA, at Yumu and Osisi	
Kambari II cluster	Kambari	Kambari II		Kamberi						with Kambari I: 67,000 (1952 W&B); 100,000 (1973 SIL)	Niger State, Magama LGA; Kebbi State, Zuru and Yauri LGAs; Kwara State, Borgu LGA	
Agaushi	Kambari	Kambari II			Cishingini		Auna				Niger State, Magama LGA; Kebbi State, Yauri LGA	
Akimba	Kambari	Kambari II			Tsɨkimba	Akimba	Auna, Wara				Niger State, Rijau, Magama LGA; Kebbi State, Yauri LGA	
Cishingini, Nwanci	Kambari	Kambari II		Cishingini, Ngwәci	Cishingini, Tsɨwәnci	Mawunci sg. Ŋwәnci pl.	Agwara	Agara’iwa			Niger State, Borgu, Magama LGA; Kebbi State, Yauri LGA	
Zubazuba	Kamuku				Gamazuba						Igwama, Mariga LGA, Niger State	
Cinda-Regi-Rogo-Kuki cluster	Kamuku	Cinda-Regi-Rogo-Kuki							Kamuku		Niger State, Chanchagga, Rafi and Mariga LGAs	
Cinda	Kamuku	Cinda-Regi-Rogo-Kuki	Oxford Primary Maths 1 (1988?)	Jinda, Majinda	Tucindә	sg. Bucindә pl. Cindә					Niger State, Mariga, Rafi, Kusheriki LGAs, Kaduna State, Birnin Gwari LGA	
Regi	Kamuku	Cinda-Regi-Rogo-Kuki			Turegi	sg. Buregi pl. Regi					Niger State, Mariga, Rafi, Kusheriki LGAs, Kaduna State, Birnin Gwari LGA	
Kuki	Kamuku	Cinda-Regi-Rogo-Kuki	Azana, Akubyar	Tiyar [town name not a language]	TuKuki	BuKuki pl. Kuki	Kamuku				Niger State, Mariga, Rafi, Kusheriki LGAs, Kaduna State, Birnin Gwari LGA	
Kwacika (extinct)	Kamuku	Cinda-Regi-Rogo-Kuki			Tukwacika	sg. Bukwacika pl. Kwacika				There was only one elderly speaker in the 1980s; hence, it is almost certainly extinct	Kaduna State, Birnin Gwari LGA	
Kwagere	Kamuku	Cinda-Regi-Rogo-Kuki									Niger State, Chanchagga, Rafi and Mariga LGAs	
Basa-Gurara–Basa-Benue–Basa-Makurdi cluster	Kamuku–Basa	Basa-Gurara–Basa-Benue–Basa-Makurdi										
Basa-Gurara	Kamuku–Basa	Basa-Gurara–Basa-Benue–Basa-Makurdi					Basa-Kwali				Federal Capital Territory, Yaba and Kwali LGAs, along the Gurara river	
Basa-Benue	Kamuku–Basa	Basa-Gurara–Basa-Benue–Basa-Makurdi		Basa	RuBasa	TuBasa		Abacha, Abatsa	Basa-Komo, Basa-Kwomu (not recommended)	30,000 (1944-50 HDG); 100,000 (1973 SIL)	Kogi State, Bassa, and Ankpa LGAs, Nasarawa State, Nasarawa LGA	
Basa-Makurdi	Kamuku–Basa										Benue State, Makurdi LGA, several villages on the north bank of the Benue, northwest of Makurdi	no data
Basa-Gumna–Basa-Kontagora cluster (extinct?)	Kamuku–Basa	Basa-Gumna–Basa-Kontagora (extinct?)										
Basa-Gumna (extinct)	Kamuku–Basa	Basa-Gumna–Basa-Kontagora (extinct?)						Gwadara-Basa, Basa Kuta, Basa-Kaduna		Only 2 known semi-speakers in 1987. The population known as Basawa speaks only Hausa. Probably now extinct	Niger State, Chanchaga LGA	
Basa-Kontagora (extinct)	Kamuku–Basa	Basa-Gumna–Basa-Kontagora (extinct?)								Fewer than 10 speakers in 1987. Probably now extinct	Niger State, Mariga LGA, N.E. of Kontagora	
Basa-Gurmana	Kamuku–Basa				Kɔrɔmba					more than 2,000 speakers (1987)	Niger State, border of Rafi and Chanchaga LGAs, Kafin Gurmana	
Rogo	Kamuku–Basa	Cinda-Regi-Rogo-Kuki			TɔRɔgɔ	BɔRɔgɔ sg. Rɔgɔ pl.			Ucanja Kamuku		Niger State, Rafi and Kusheriki LGAs, around Ucanja town, 30 km northwest of Kagara.	
Fungwa	Kamuku–Basa				Tufungwa	Afungwa	Ura, Ula			900 (1949 H.D. Gunn)	Niger State, Rafi LGA, at Gulbe, Gabi Tuƙurbe, Urenciki, Ringa and Utana	
Hùngwә̀ryə̀	Kamuku–Basa		Dialects: Bitbit (Kwabitu), Lәklәk (Karaku), Jinjin (Makangara), Wũswũs (Karaiya), Tәmbәrjә (Tambere)		Cәhungwә̀ryə̀, Tʷə̀hungwә̀ryə̀ [ʨə̀hungwә̀ryə̀]	Bùhùngwə̀ryə̀ sg., ə̀hùngwə̀ryə̀ pl.			Ngwoi, Ngwe, Ungwe, Ingwe, Nkwoi, Ngwai, Ungwai, Hungworo	1000 (1949 HDG), 5000 (2007 est.)	Niger State, Rafi, Kusheriki LGA, around Kagara and Maikujeri towns	
Shama–Sambuga cluster	Kamuku–Basa	Shama–Sambuga			Tushama	sg. Bushama, pl. Ushama			Kamuku		Niger State, Rafi LGA	
Shama	Kamuku–Basa	Shama–Sambuga			Tushama	Bushama sg. Ushama pl.					Niger State, Rafi LGA, Ushama [=Kawo] town. 15 km northwest of Kagara	
Sambuga (extinct)	Kamuku–Basa	Shama–Sambuga								Possibly extinct (2008)	Niger State, Rafi LGA, Sambuga town. 10 km northwest of Kagara	
Shen	Lake			Laro, Laru					Laruwa	1,000 (1992 est.)	Niger State, Borgu LGA	
Rop	Lake			Lupa, Lopa	Kirikjir	Djiri			Lopawa	960 (NAT 1950); 5,000 (1992 est.)	Niger State, Borgu LGA, Kebbi State, Yauri LGA. At least 6 villages on the east shore of Kainji Lake plus two others on the western shore.	
Tsupamini	Lake			Lopa				Lopanci	Lopawa	960 (NAT 1950); 5,000 (1992 est.). Global estimate with Rop	Niger State, Borgu LGA, Kebbi State, Yauri LGA. At least 6 villages on the east shore of Kainji Lake plus two others on the west shore.	
Reshe	Lake		Birәmi (South), Bәmәmәdu (Northwest), Bәpalame (Northeast). Harris (1930:321) claims a ‘secret dialect’ called Tsudalupe which = Bәmәmәdu.	Tsure Ja	Tsureshe	Bareshe		Gunganci	Gungawa, Yaurawa	15,000 (1931 G&C); 30,000 (1973 SIL)	Kebbi State, Yauri LGA; Niger State, Borgu LGA	
Hun–Saare	Northern		Western (sSaare) (around Dukku), Eastern (tHun) (around Rijau), Tungan Bunu	Ethun	tHun, sSaare	Hunnɛ	Duka	Dukanci		19,700 (1949 Gunn and Conant); 30,000 (1980 UBS)	Kebbi State, Sakaba LGA; Niger State, Rijau LGA	
Kag–Fer–Jiir–Kar–Koor–Ror–[Us]–Zuksun cluster	Northern	Kag–Fer–Jiir–Kar–Koor–Ror–[Us]–Zuksun					The name ut-Main has been adopted by various members of this cluster as a cover term for these languages, but whether it will be widely adopted remains to be seen.	Fakanci, Fakkanci		12,300 (1949 G&C)	Kebbi State, Zuru and Wasagu LGAs, west of Dabai	
Kag	Northern	Kag–Fer–Jiir–Kar–Koor–Ror–[Us]–Zuksun			tKag	sg. woo Kag, pl. Kagne		Faka, Fakai (town name), Fakanci, Fakkanci	Pәku–Nu (cLela name)		Kebbi State, Zuru LGA, Mahuta and Fakai areas	
Fer	Northern	Kag–Fer–Jiir–Kar–Koor–Ror–[Us]–Zuksun			tFer	sg. wasFer, pl. asFer			Kukum Wipsi–Ni (cLela name)		Kebbi State, Zuru LGA, around Kukum town	
Jiәr	Northern	Kag–Fer–Jiir–Kar–Koor–Ror–[Us]–Zuksun			tJiәr	sg. wauJiәr, pl. aJiәr		Gelanci Serim	Gelawa, Geeri–ni		Kebbi State, Zuru LGA, around Bajidda; Rijau LGA, Niger State	
Kәr	Northern	Kag–Fer–Jiir–Kar–Koor–Ror–[Us]–Zuksun			tKәr	sg. wauKәr, pl. Kәrne		Kela, Adoma Kelanci Kilinci	Keri–Ni Kelawa		Kebbi State, Zuru and Wasagu LGAs, north of Mahuta but south of the Kag river	
Koor	Northern	Kag–Fer–Jiir–Kar–Koor–Ror–[Us]–Zuksun			t–ma–Koor	sg. wauKoor, pl. aKoor					Kebbi State, Zuru LGA, around Bakara	
Ror	Northern	Kag–Fer–Jiir–Kar–Koor–Ror–[Us]–Zuksun	Dialect used for language development		ǝt–ma–Ror	sg. wauRor, pl. aRor			Tudawa d–Gwan		Kebbi State, Zuru LGA around Birnin Tudu	
Us	Northern	Kag–Fer–Jiir–Kar–Koor–Ror–[Us]–Zuksun	Us have no specific dialect but speak like the Ror		tUs	sg. wauUs, pl. aUs, asUs					Kebbi State, Zuru LGA, west of Fakai	
Zuksun	Northern	Kag–Fer–Jiir–Kar–Koor–Ror–[Us]–Zuksun			tZuksun	sg. wauZuksun, pl. aZuksun			Zusu Wipsi–ni		Kebbi State, Zuru LGA around Tungan Kuka, south of Fakai	
Wuri-Gwamhyә–Mba	Northern			Gwamfi		wa–Gwamhi sg. a–Gwamhi pl. and wa–Wuri sg. a–Wuri pl.		Banganci	Lyase–ne Dәknu Bangawa for Gwamhi	Two peoples with one language	Kebbi State, Wasagu LGA; Gwamhi around Danko town and Wuri around Maga town	The term Wurkum is applied to the Kyak, Banda, Kulung, Kwonci, Maghdi, Kholok, Mingang, Pero, Piya, and Nyam group, several of which remain to be investigated.
cLela	Northwestern		Zuru, Ribah		cLela (Clela, C–Lela), Lelna	Kәlela sg., Lelna pl.		Chilala Dakarci	Lalawa, Dakarkari, Dakkarkari, Kalla–Kalla, Cala–Cala	47,000 (1949 G&C); 69,000 (1971 Welmers)	Kebbi State, Zuru, Sakaba and Wasagu LGAs; Niger State, Rijau LGA. Around Zuru town	
Rin	Shiroro		Awәgә is sometimes classified as a dialect of Rin, but it may in fact be a distinct but vanishing language spoken by one Rin clan.		Tә̀rĩ́, Tarin	sg. Bùrĩ,́ pl. Arĩ ́	Arringeu, Pongu, Pongo, Pangu			3,675 (1949 HDG); >20,000 (1988)	Niger State, Rafi LGA, near Tegina	Despite the indigenous name, forms of Pangu are preferred by the community for publications purposes.

== Numerals ==
Comparison of numerals in individual languages:

Classification	Language	1	2	3	4	5	6	7	8	9	10
Western, Reshe	Reshe (Tsureshe)	tsúnnɛ̀	rìsə̄	tàtswā	nāʃẽ́	tɔ̃̄	tēnzɔ̄	tànsã̄	dálànzɔ̀	tānāʃẽ́	úpwà
Western, Basa	Bassa	hĩn	jèbí	tàtɔ	néʃì	táná	tʃìhin	tʃéndʒe	tɔndatɔ	tʃíndʒìʃì	uḿpwá
Western, Duka	C'lela	tʃĩ́	ʔílɨ̀	tɨ́ːt͡ʃù	náːsé	tã́	t͡ʃíhĩ̀	tã̀ʔílɨ̀ (5 + 2)	jɨ́ːɾù	dóːɾè	ʔóːpá
Western, Duka	ut-Ma'in	tʃɘ̄ːn	jɘ̄ːr	tɘ̄t	náːs	tán	ʃìʃìn	tàʔèr (5 + 2) ?	éːr	dʒʷɘ̄ːr	ɔ̄p
Western, Kambari	Tsishingini (Kambari)	íyyán	ìɾɛ̀	tàʔàtsú	nə́ʃín	táːwún	tə̀ːlí	tʃìndɛ̀ɾɛ́	kùnlə̀	kùttʃí	kùppá
Western, Kamuku	Western Acipa (Cicipu)	tôː	jápù	tâːtù	nósì	tã̂u	tóɾíhĩ̀	tíndàjà	kùrílːò	kùtítːí	ùkúpːà
Western, Kamuku	Cinda (Kamuku)	ĩ́jɑ́	ⁿdə́ɰə̀	tɑ́tɔ̀	nə́ʃì	tɑ́ɑ̀	tə́nə́hì	tə́ndə́ɰə̀	tə́ntɑ́tɔ̀	tə́ndə́ʃì	òpɑ́
Western, Kamuku	Fungwa (Cifungwa)	ń / biké	jógò	tátù	nɔ́ʃì	tá	tʃíjĩ̀	tĩ́dòlò	tĩ́dátù	tĩ́díʃì	húpɛ́
Western, Kamuku	Hungworo (Hungwere)	ĩ́ːjə̃́	ʔʲə̃̂d͡ʒə̀	tât̼ɔ̀	ùnə́sĩ̀	sàtá	ūt̼únìhĩ̄	ūtə́ndə̀ɾʲə̄	ūtátàt̼ɔ̄ (2 x 4) ?	ūtə́nə̀sĩ̄	īkópʲè
Western, Kamuku	Pongu (Pangu)	hĩ́ː	ɾêːnù	tâːtù	nə̃́ːʃĩ̀	tá	tʃíníhì	tə̃́ndə́ɾə̀	tə̃́ndáːtù	tṹndúʃì	úpwá
Eastern, Northern Jos, Jera	Anaguta (Iguta)	dínkā	rɛ̀ːpú	tààrū / tàːrū	nàːnzī	ʃùːbì	twàːsì	súnāːrí	ùrū	tɔ̀rbɔ̀	būtúːrú
Eastern, Northern Jos, Kauru	Gure (Gbiri-Niraɡu)	pi:ʃem	piːbɑː	piːtær	piːnɑːz	piːʃiː	piːtæ ʃi	piːsundæriː	piːkunæs	piːturuːriː	kiʃiːæbɑː / nikpiːrinætʃeti
Eastern, Northern Jos, Kauru	Kurama (Akurmi)	nìdíi	tɨɽyá	tɨtáaɽɔ	tɨnáazɛ	úʃii	útasɛ	úsúndèɽì	úɽiɽé	ùtáɽá	níkúɽí
