= Cuba language =

Kainji language spoken in Nigeria

Cuba
- Urcibar
- Tsucuba
- Native to: Nigeria
- Region: Kebbi State
- Native speakers: 1,000 (2014)
- Language family: Niger–Congo?: Atlantic–Congo; Benue–Congo; Kainji; Kainji Lake; Oleran; Cuba

Language codes
- ISO 639-3: cbq
- Glottolog: cuba1236

Urcibar
- Person: dɔ̀tʃíbár
- People: òːtʃíbár
- Language: ɘ̀ɹtʃíbár

Rerang
- Person: dɔ̀ɾìɾã́ŋ
- People: òːɾìɾã́ŋ
- Language: òlːèɾã́ŋ

Cuba (Tsucuba), anglicized as Shuba and also known as Urcibar in neighboring Lopa, is a minor Kainji language of Nigeria, spoken by a thousand people in Kebbi State.

The name Rerang (Oleran) subsumes both Cuba and the closely related Lopa language that surrounds it.

Blench concludes that Cuba is more closely related to Shen (Laru) than it is to Rop (Lopa).

== Location ==
Cuba is spoken in the large villages of ò̃tʃébá (Cifamini), tʷò̃tʃíɡí (Gungun Tagwaye) and ò̃sán (Kwanga); and the minor villages of àjũ ́̃m (Yumu), àːʔʲɔ́ (Bakari) and ámbú (Ambu shiri).
