= Abdulmalik Mohammed Sarkindaji =

Nigerian lawyer and politician

Abdulmalik Mohammed Sarkindaji is a Nigerian lawyer, public servant, and political strategist serving as the Speaker of the 10th Niger State House of Assembly. He is a member of the All Progressives Congress (APC) and represents the Mariga Local Government Constituency in Niger State.

== Early life and education ==
Sarkindaji was born in Kontagora, Niger State, Nigeria. He began his education at Mustapha Comprehensive School and later obtained his Senior Secondary School Certificate in 2001. He earned a Diploma in Law from the Federal Polytechnic, Birnin Kebbi (2004), and proceeded to Usmanu Danfodio University, Sokoto, where he graduated with an L.L.B in 2010. He was called to the Nigerian Bar in 2011 after completing studies at the Nigerian Law School, Enugu.

In 2020, he obtained a Master’s degree in International Studies and Diplomacy from Ibrahim Badamasi Babangida University, Lapai.

== Legal and political career ==
After his call to bar, Sarkindaji completed his National Youth Service (NYSC) at a law firm where he worked as an assistant solicitor. He also worked as a financial legal adviser and estate consultant.

He entered politics in 2016 and was elected Executive Chairman of Mariga Local Government Area. In 2019, he was appointed Commissioner for Local Government and Chieftaincy Affairs, and later Commissioner for Youth and Sport in 2021 by Governor Abubakar Sani Bello.

In 2023, Sarkindaji was elected to the Niger State House of Assembly. On June 13, 2023, he was unanimously elected as Speaker of the 10th Assembly.

== Student and youth leadership ==
During his time at Usmanu Danfodio University, Sarkindaji was actively involved in student leadership. He served as the President of the National Association of Niger State Students (NANISS), and in 2009, he was elected Speaker of the association's national parliament.

== Political career ==
In 2016, Sarkindaji entered local governance as Executive Chairman of Mariga Local Government Area, serving until 2019. He was appointed Commissioner for Local Government and Chieftaincy Affairs in 2019 by Governor Abubakar Sadiq Sani Bello. In 2021, he was reassigned as Commissioner for Youth and Sports.

Ahead of the 2023 general elections, Sarkindaji resigned his commissioner position to contest for a seat in the Niger State House of Assembly under the All Progressives Congress (APC). He was elected to represent Mariga Local Government Constituency and subsequently elected Speaker of the 10th Assembly on 13 June 2023.

== Malikiya Movements ==
Sarkindaji is the founder of the Malikiya Movements, a philanthropic initiative aimed at supporting vulnerable and less privileged citizens through education and welfare programs.

== Personal life ==
He enjoys reading, mentoring, traveling, mediation, and playing table tennis.
