= Puku language =

Puku may refer to:

- a dialect of ut-Ma'in language, Nigeria
- a dialect of Noho language, Cameroon and Equatorial Guinea
