= Shingini language =

Kainji language spoken in Nigeria

Shingini
- Native to: Nigeria
- Region: Niger State
- Ethnicity: Kambari
- Native speakers: 200,000 (2004)
- Language family: Niger–Congo?: Benue–Congo; Kainji; Kambari; Shingini
- Dialects: Ibeto; Rofia
- Writing system: Latin

Language codes
- ISO 639-3: Either: tsw – Tsishingini (Salka) asg – Cishingini
- Glottolog: tsis1238 Tsishingini cish1238 Cishingini

Shingini
- Person: Sshingini, Məshingini
- People: Əshingini
- Language: Cishingini, Tsishingini

The Shingini language is a Kainji language of Nigeria spoken by the Kambari people. Its two dialects are Tsishingini (Salka, Ashaganna) and Cishingini (Chishingini).

== Cishingini ==
Cishingini, also known as Chishingini or Ashaganna, is spoken in Borgu and Agwara Local Governments of Niger State and in Ngaski LGA of Kebbi State.
