= Yumlu =

Yumlu is a Turkish surname. Notable people with the surname include:

- Mustafa Yumlu (born 1987), Turkish footballer
- Nilüfer Yumlu (born 1955), Turkish pop singer

== See also ==
- Yumu (disambiguation)
