= Sa'adatu Kolo =

Nigerian politician

- Organization: Sa'adatu Kolo Amazons
- Title: Honourable
- Political party: PDP
- Spouse: Alhaji Muhammad Dan'Azumi Kolo

Honourable Sa’adatu Muhammad Kolo, the current Niger State PDP State Woman Leader is a former Niger State House of Assemble member representing Mashegu Constituency, a former Lecturer and sport enthusiastic who owns a Female Football Club in Niger State.

== Biography ==
Sa’adatu Muhammad Kolo was a Member, Niger State House of Assembly representing Mashegu Local Government. She is married to Alhaji Muhammad Danazumi Kolo. She is a former lecturer at Niger State College of Education and the current State Woman Leader of the PDP Niger State. Kolo is also a child's right activist, philanthropist, sport enthusiast, administrator and an advocate of women in politics.

Kolo is of the view that more women should venture into politics so as issues affecting them could be properly addressed. Saying her contesting election is to add to the number of women so that issues concerning women will have more women to vote for it and no longer be decided by men who are in the majority because they will naturally be biased adding that Politics where it is generally believed, though erroneously that politics is an all men affairs.

Kolo was the only woman out of six others that emerged from the PDP National Assembly primary election to contest for the House of Representatives seat of Mariga, Mashegu, Wushishi, Kontagora Federal Constituency in 2019.

Women cannot afford to shy away from politics; they constitute the largest voting group and are usually the worst hit by any bad political decision.

Kolo as a sport enthusiast is the Managing Director and Chief Executive of a privately owned Female Football Club in Niger State, the Sa’adatu Kolo Amazons. This has made her to advocate for adequate funding of sports in the country.

Kolo is also the Chairperson, Niger State Female Football Development Team, that has made her to lament on the dilapidated sporting facilities spread across Niger State noting that it is discouraging the youths from getting involved in sporting activities.

Her club the Sa’adatu Kolo Amazons have been playing in the Nigerian Women Football league recording some wins and losses.
