= Yumu language =

Yumu may refer to:

- Yumu language (Australia)
- Yumu language (Nigeria)
