= Gadi language =

Gadi may refer to:

- The Gaɗi language of Nigeria
- The Gaddi language of India
