= Bako Kassim Alfa =

Nigerian politician

- Born: 1960 (age 65–66)
- Occupation: Politician
- Notable work: A member of Niger State Houses of Assembly since 8th assembly representing Bida I.

Bako Kassim Alfa (born 1960) is a member of Niger State Houses of Assembly since 8th assembly representing Bida I, and is the current deputy speaker of the House of Assembly. He has been chairman education committee since in the 8th assembly before he was elected deputy speaker in the 9th assembly alongside Abdullahi Wuse, a first term lawmaker elected speaker.

== Resigns position ==
Bako Kasim resign his position as the deputy speaker of Niger State House of Assembly on July 23, 2020 without disclosing any reason and was succeeded by Jibrin Ndagi Baba of Lavun constituency.
