= Bassa people =

Bassa people may refer to:

- Bassa people (Cameroon)
- Bassa people (Liberia)
- Bassa people (Nigeria)
