= Yumu language (Nigeria) =

Kainji language of Nigeria

Yumu
- Native to: Nigeria
- Region: Niger State
- Language family: Niger–Congo?: Benue–Congo; Kainji; Kambari; Yumu

Language codes
- ISO 639-3: None (mis)
- Glottolog: None

Yumu is a minor Kainji language of Nigeria. It is listed as a potential Kambari language by Roger Blench, however it does not have an Ethnologue nor Glottolog entry.

The village of Yumu, said to be "of obscure origin", is located on the western side of Kainji Lake in Agwara District, Niger State, adjacent to the areas of the divergent Kainji languages of Reshe, Lopa and Laru.

A 1979 linguistic survey of Nigeria, citing Rev. A. Washbrook, lists Yumu as either a dialect of Lopa or of Kambari.
