= Fungwa language =

Kainji language spoken in Nigeria

Fungwa
- Ura
- Native to: Nigeria
- Region: Niger State
- Native speakers: (1,000 cited 1992)
- Language family: Niger–Congo?: Atlantic–Congo; Benue–Congo; Kainji; Shiroro; Baushi–Fungwa; Fungwa

Language codes
- ISO 639-3: ula
- Glottolog: fung1245

Fungwa
- Person: bu-fúngwà
- People: a-fungwa
- Language: cì-fúngwà

Fungwa, or Ura (Ula; known as Ɓura-wa in Hausa) is a Kainji language in Pandogari, Niger State, Nigeria. The same word is also used for the people. Roger Blench estimated their numbers at no more than 1,000. Farming is the main occupation of the Fungwa while pottery is also an occupation practised by the women. The Fungwa live in the five villages of Gulbe, Gabi Tukurbe, Urenciki, Renga (Ringa) and Utana along the Pandogari–Allawa road in Rafi, Nigeria.

== Gallery ==
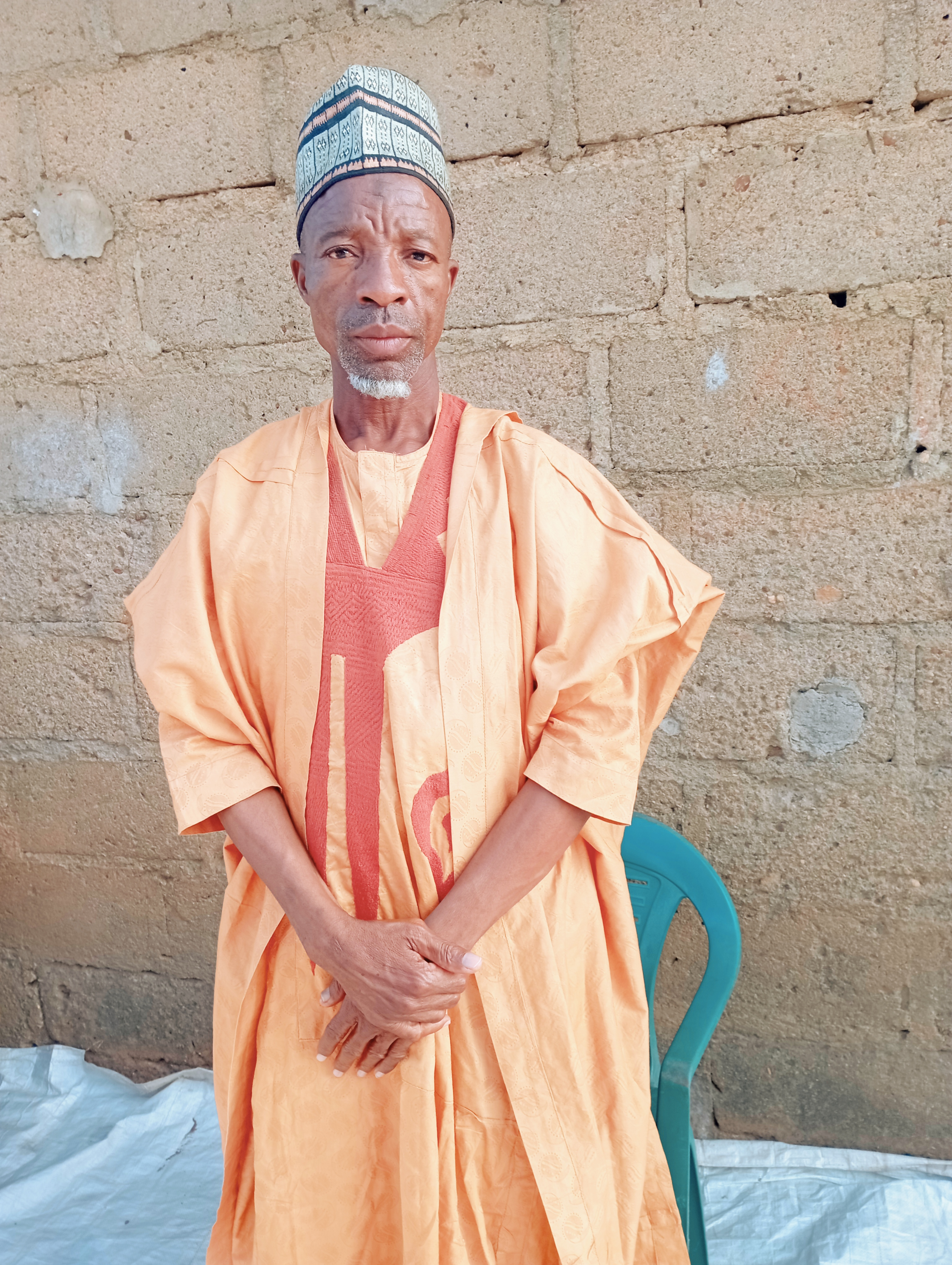
Former Head of Ura district Ringa (Late Alhaji Samaila Shekarau)

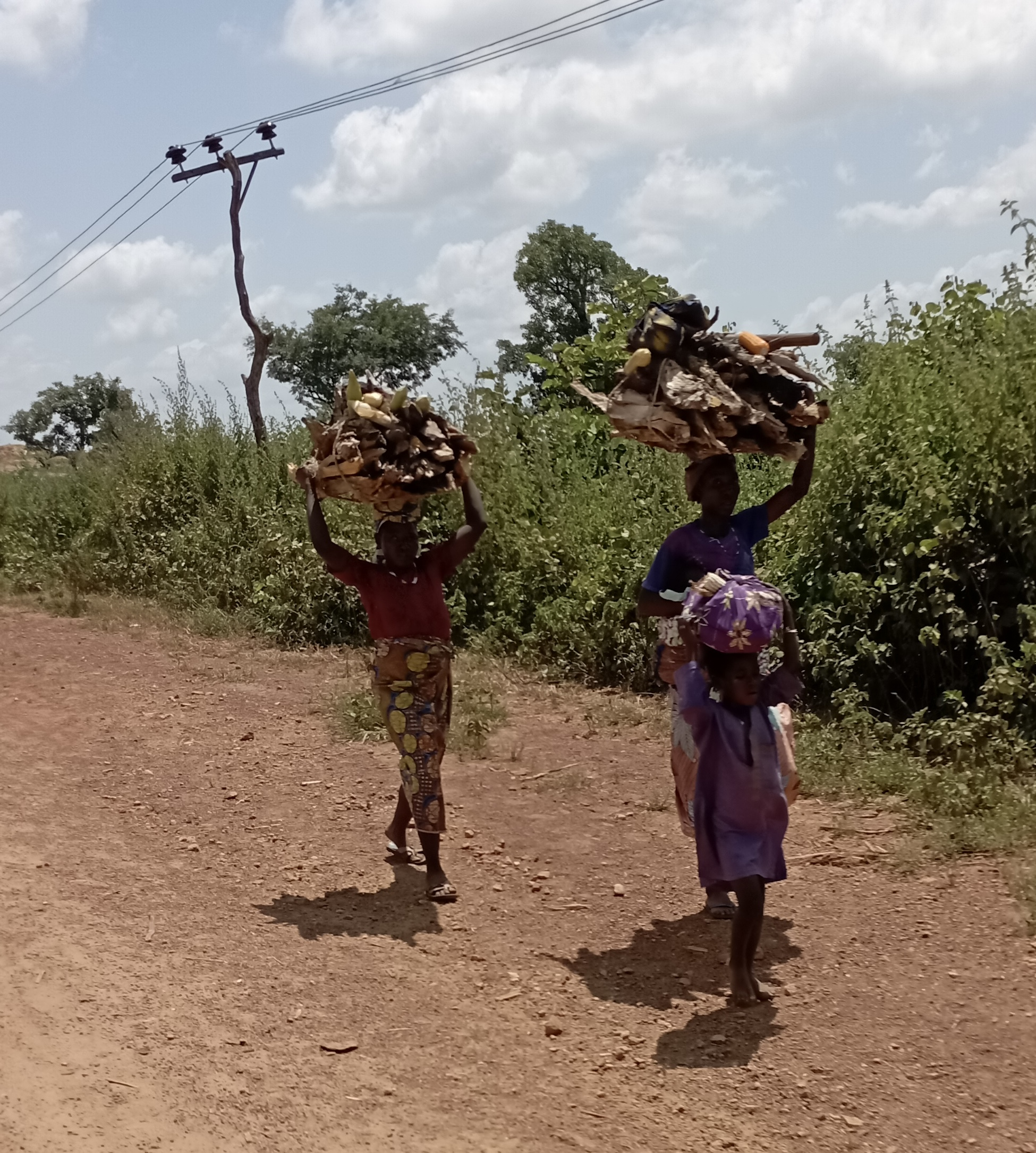
Two Ura women carrying firewoods

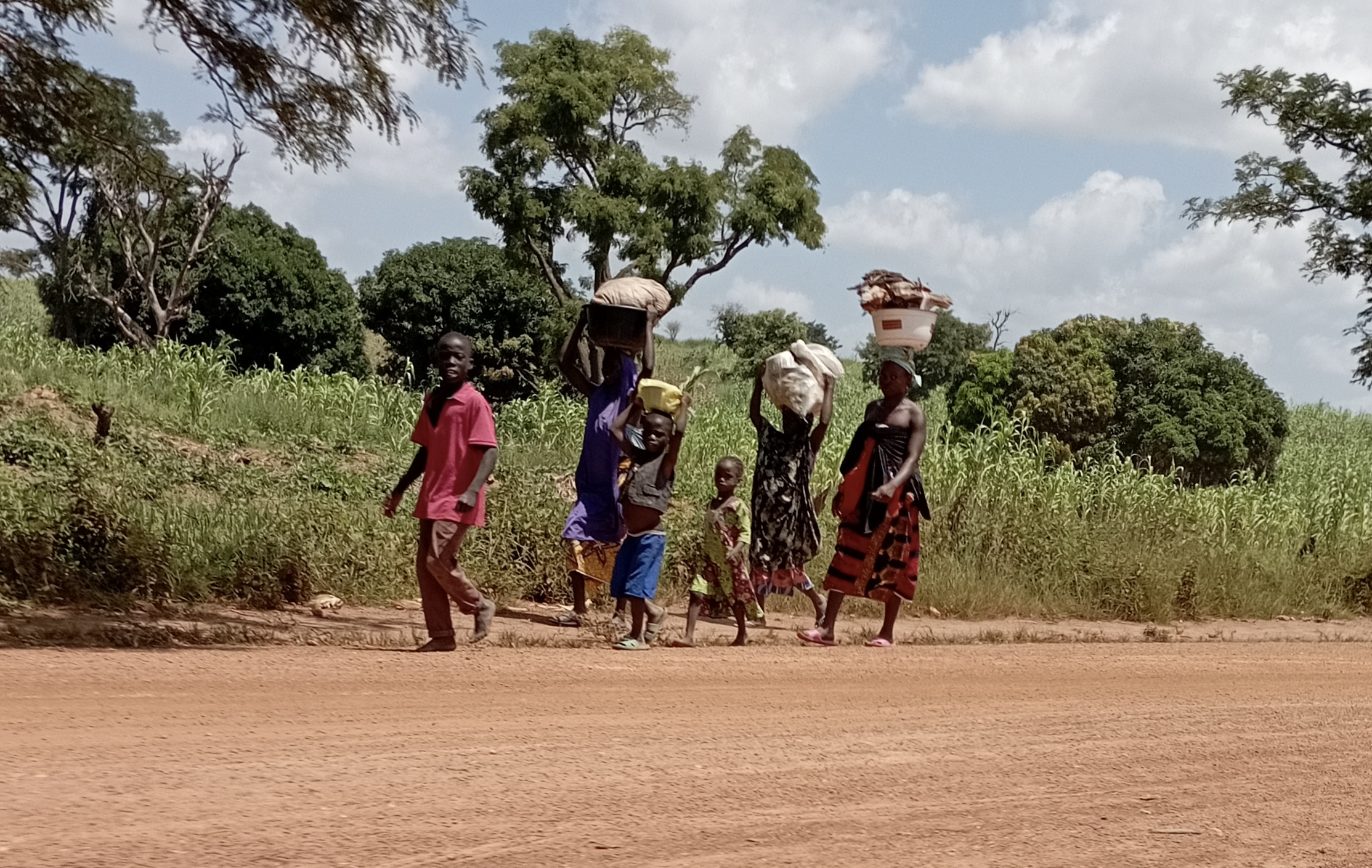
Ura women and children carrying things

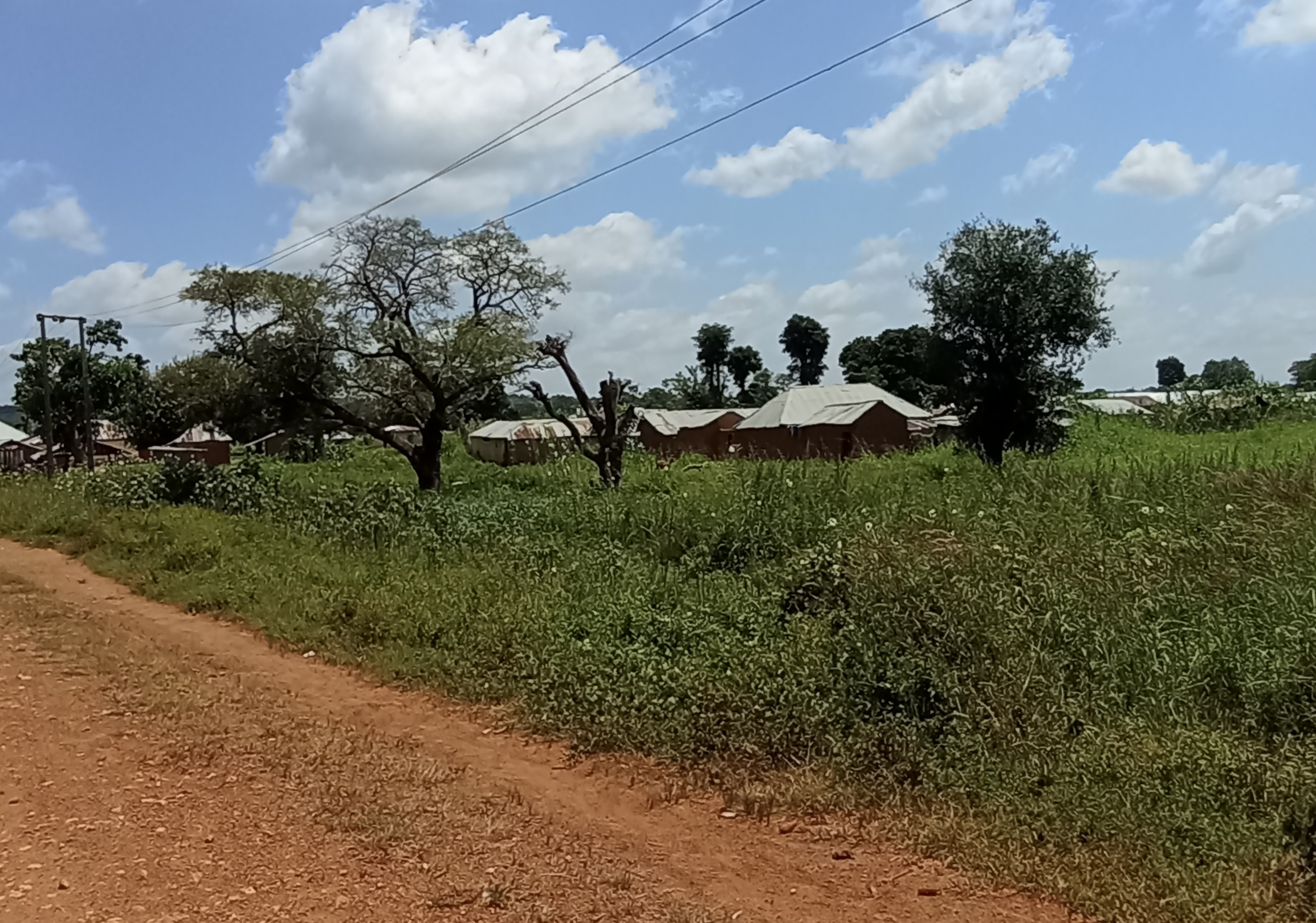
Ura village in Ringa district

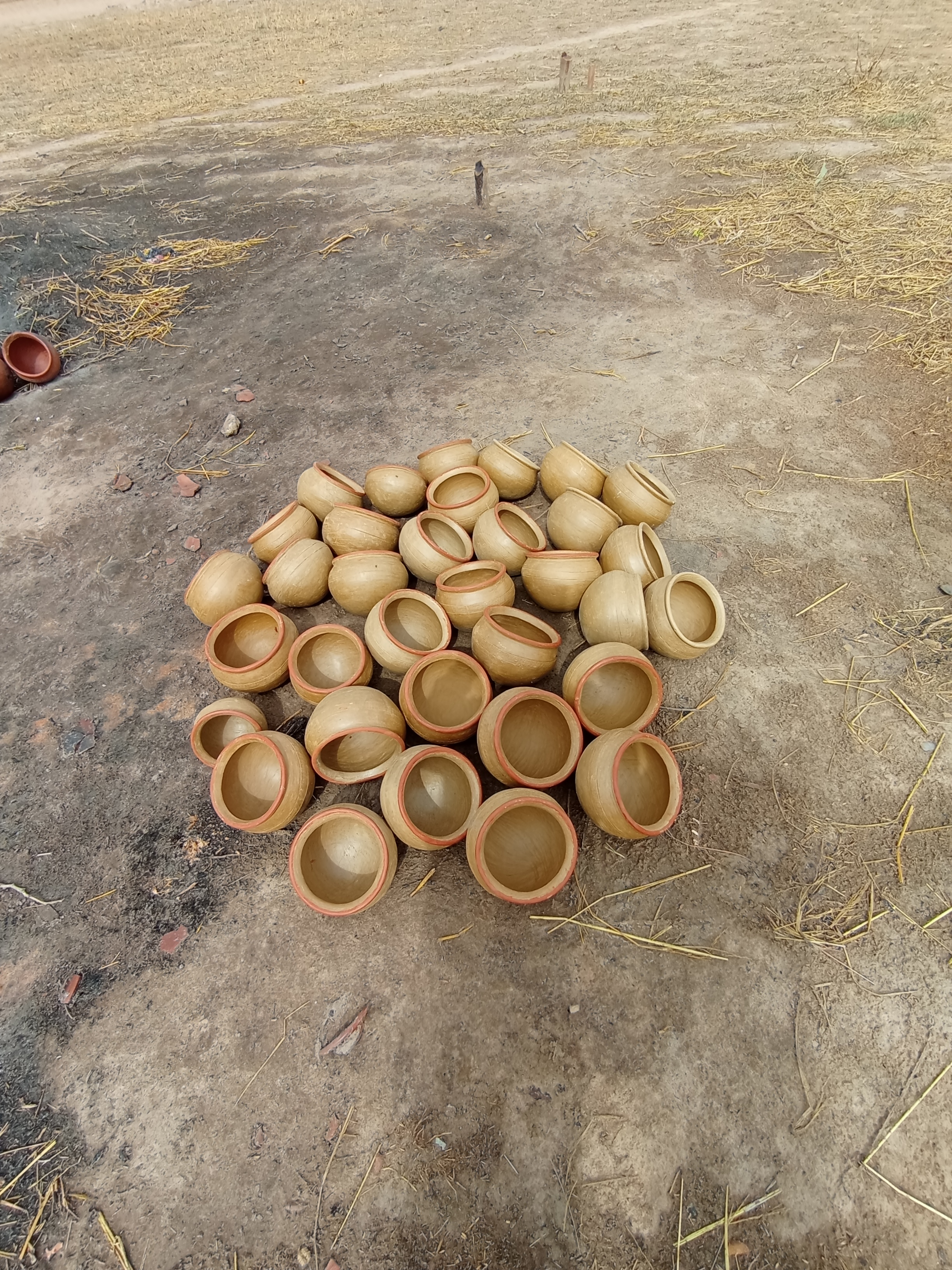
Ura women's pots

== See also ==
- Pongu language, also known as Rin
