= Bauchi language =

Benue–Congo language of Nigeria

Bauchi
- Native to: Nigeria
- Region: Rafi, Nigeria LGA, Niger State
- Ethnicity: Bauchi
- Native speakers: (20,000 cited 1988)
- Language family: Niger–Congo?: Atlantic–Congo; Benue–Congo; Kainji; Shiroro; Baushi–Fungwa; Bauchi

Language codes
- ISO 639-3: bsf
- Glottolog: bauc1238

Zora
- Person: uZora
- People: aZora
- Language: iZora

Hɨpɨna
- Person: Vihɨpɨna
- People: Vihɨpɨna
- Language: Tihɨpɨna

Mɨn
- Person: Vʷinyi Mɨn
- People: Ayi Mɨn
- Language: Tiimɨn

Dәkә
- Person: Vundәk
- People: Andәka
- Language: Tundәkә

Wãyã
- Person: Vũwãyã
- People: Ãwãyã
- Language: Tũwãyã

Bauchi (Bauci, Baushi) is a cluster of Kainji languages spoken in Rafi, Nigeria LGA, Niger State, Nigeria.

== Languages ==
The Baushi languages are (Blench 2012):

- Samburu
- Ndəkə (Madaka) - three clans: Undo, Sambora and Jibwa
- Hupɨnɨ (Supana)
- Wãyã (Wayam)
- Rubu
- Mɨɨn

Blench (2018) lists the Baushi languages as Ndəkə, Hɨpɨn, Mɨɨ, Rub, Samburu, and Wãyã.

== Phonology ==
The Bauchi languages have a set of unusual sounds for the area, called "linguo-labials" by Blench. They are similar to the interdental approximants of the Philippines, where the tongue can protrude slightly over the lower lip.
