= Tawari attack =

2020 attack in Tawari, Kogi, Nigeria

- Part of Herder-farmer conflicts in Nigeria
- Location: Tawari, Kogi State, Nigeria
- Date: January 2–3, 2020; 11:15 pm – morning
- Target: Notable Tawari community members
- Deaths: 29
- Injuries: Unknown
- Perpetrator: Fulani herdsmen
- No. of participants: 100
- Motive: Reprisal attack for the deaths of four herdsmen

On January 3, 2020, suspected Fulani militants attacked the town of Tawari, Kogi State, Nigeria, killing twenty-nine people.

== Background ==
Fulani people in Nigeria are traditionally nomadic pastoralists, and other ethnic groups in Nigeria are traditionally farmers. Conflicts between land rights and usage have occurred in Nigeria for decades, coupled with religious tensions as the Fulani are Muslim and some farming groups are Christian or animist. Prior to the attack in Tawari, four herdsmen suspected of being kidnappers were killed along the Lokoja-Abuja highway by Nigerian security agencies, following a tip from a resident of Tawari. Other herdsmen vowed revenge on Tawari for the killings. The Aguma, or leader, of Tawari, Alhaji Yahya Idris Tawari, stated that the herdsmen lived in the community in peace until they moved out en masse a few days before the attack.

== Massacre ==
The raid began at night at around 11:15 pm. Around a hundred militants burned down several houses, a church in the town, and Alhaji Yahya Tawari's palace. Notable community members including clerics, were targeted. A survivor of the attacks stated that in her father's home, the women were rushed out and the men were killed. The survivor also stated that the attackers were speaking Hausa. One of the buildings damaged in the attack was a historic clinic established by missionaries during the colonial era.

== Aftermath ==
Nigerian president Muhammadu Buhari expressed his condolences. Kogi State governor Yahaya Bello pushed for calm among the residents of Tawari. The administrator of Kogi's LGAs, Muhammad Osuku, described the killings as "wicked and heartless" following a tour.

An investigation by the Nigerian Tribune discovered that ward chair Ibrahim Simbabi and Imam, Mallam Zakari Salihu were targeted and killed by the herdsmen. Twenty of the men killed were Bassa, and three were Gbagyi. Several others, including policemen, were injured in the attack. The final toll of the attack was twenty-nine people killed.
