= Bassa people (Nigeria) =

Ethnic group in Nigeria

The Bassa also called Basa is an ethnic group primarily found in the North Central Nigeria. The Bassa people speak the Bassa language, which belongs to the Kainji family under the sub-phylum Western-Kainji, also referred to as Rubassa. Bassa people have a rich cultural heritage, with a strong emphasis on traditional practices such as masquerade festivals like the Ikɛ masquerade and initiation rites like in the Ugunu Cultural Festival.

The Bassa people are a discrete ethnic group in Nigeria, specifically referring to the Bassa-speaking people, and should not be confused with the Bassa Nge, who have their origins traced to the Nupe people.

The Bassa speaking people of Nigeria have a vivid history of great age, with evidence implying they have occupied the Nok region for thousands of years. Their historical roots date back to around 1530 BCE, given their strong ties to the Nok Culture, a civilization known for its terracotta sculptures and artifacts. This connection to the Nok Culture indicates that the Bassa people have had a physical presence in the region.

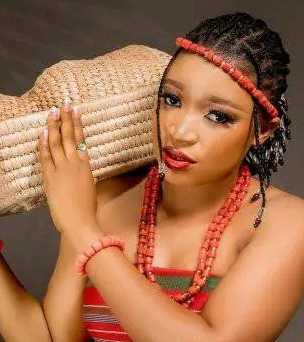
A Bassa lady dressed in the Ogboro Attire

Bassa people are primarily found in the Federal Capital Territory (FCT), specifically in Kwali, Abaji, Gwagwalada, Kuje, Bwari, and Municipal areas. Gwagwalada serves as their traditional headquarters. Additionally, Bassa communities can be found in various states, including: Kogi in Bassa, Dekina, Ankpa, Koto, and Lokoja Local Government Areas Niger in Kontagora, Shiroro, Mashegu, Gurara, Wushishi, Rafi, Minna, Lapai, Suleja Local Government Areas Nasarawa in Kokona, Toto, Karu, Keffi, Doma, and Nasarawa Local Government Areas Benue in Apa-Agatu and Makurdi and Kwara states.

The population of the Bassa people is estimated at 300,000 as of 2020. However, some sources suggest that this figure may be highly disputed, with estimates suggesting a population triple this size or more.

The major occupation of the Bassa people is farming. This has led to their spread across various regions of the country, including Oyo, Ekiti, and Edo.

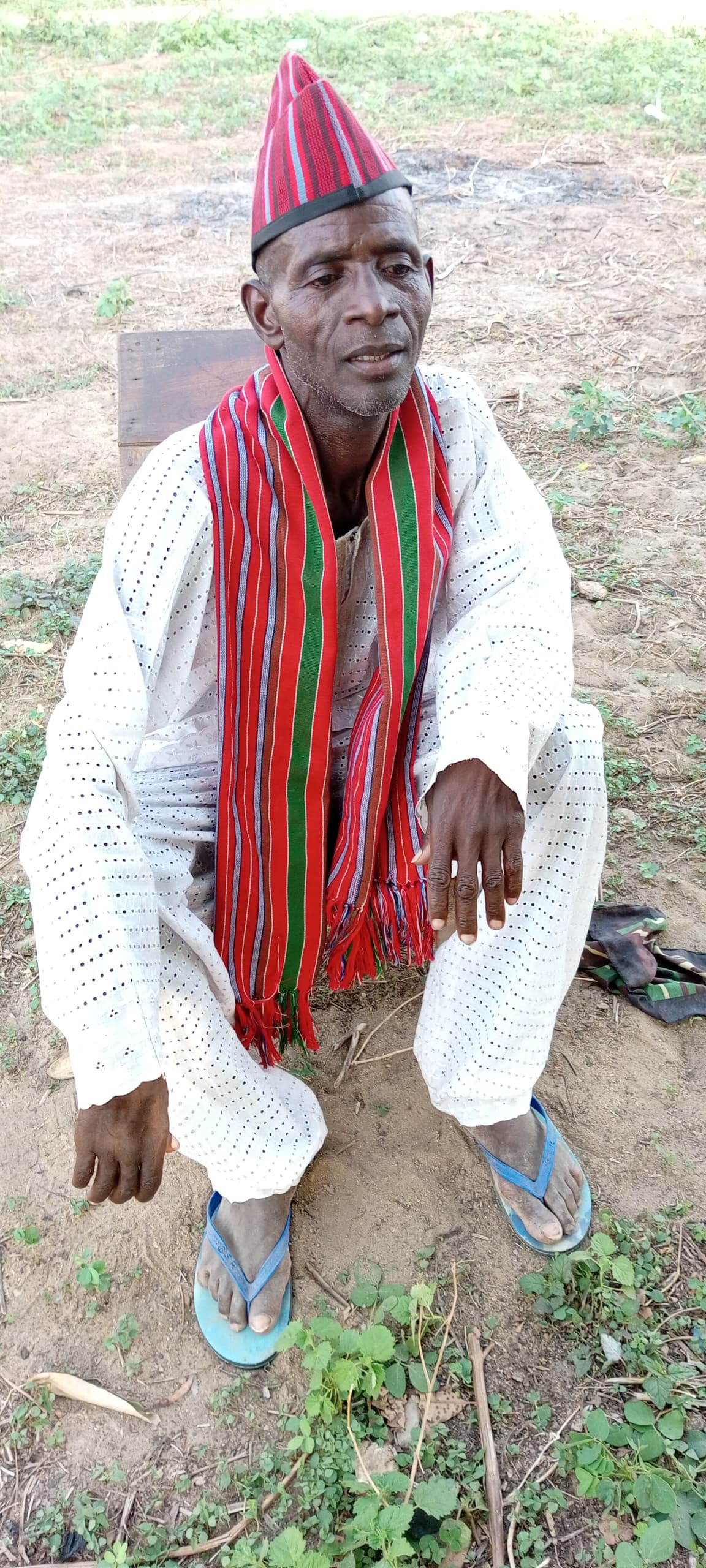
An old Bassa man relaxing, ready to tell tales to young ones

Some popular Bassa towns include Gwagwalada, Toto, Tawari Ugya, Gbameni Oguma, Shiroro, Ashara, Kundu, Turuku, Katakpa, Kassanki, Wukara, Gbashikere, Juwa, Rubochi (Urubochi), Keyenfu (Keyenhu), Zwere, Wusa, Sardauna Gbemgbem, Tekpese, Udwa, Kpakwu Bassa, Kongbo, Giri, Sauka, Rukubi, Bassa (Abuja airport road), Oweito (I'hwetu), Dausu, O'nuku), Robomi (Urubomi), I'kende.

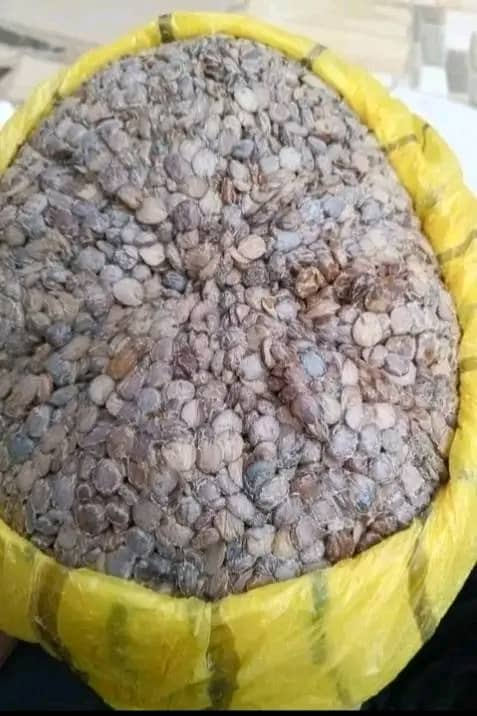
Bindo (African Locust beans) processed by Bassa woman

== History ==
The Bassa people are an ethnic group with a widespread presence across various African countries, including Nigeria, Cameroon, Liberia, Sierra Leone, Ivory Coast, and the Liberian coast. Their origins are rooted in ancient Egypt, from where they migrated to their current locations.

Historical accounts suggest that the Bassa people migrated from Egypt due to internal conflicts or wars with the Arabs. This migration had a profound impact on the Bassa people, shaping their culture, traditions, and identity.

== Migration ==
In Nigeria, the Bassa people are a distinct tribe with a significant politico-socio-economic influence. Their hardworking nature has contributed to their unique impact on the country. Through their diligence and perseverance, the Bassa people have established themselves as a vital part of Nigeria's cultural and economic fabric.

Despite their peaceful nature, the Bassa people have faced significant challenges, including internecine strife. The pre-jihad era saw politico-religious contests for domination in the north, resulting in a catastrophic exodus of the Bassa people from their initial countryside to their present abodes.

The principal cause of this exodus was the internecine strife that plagued Gumna, the Bassa headquarters during the pre-jihad period. This strife led to a grievous displacement of the Bassa people, forcing them to migrate to new locations in search of peace and stability.

== Language ==
The Bassa language exhibits a significant linguistic affinity with the Hausa language, although not with the Fulani language. This affinity is further underscored by the geographical proximity of the Bassa and Hausa peoples. A notable feature of this linguistic relationship is the presence of homophones, which are words that are pronounced similarly but have different spellings due to differences in the alphabets used by the two languages.

The Bassa and Hausa languages exhibit distinct phonetic and orthographic differences. For instance: "i" and "ɛ" are used distinctively, as in "madawaki" (Hausa) and "madachɛ" (Bassa), "j" and "zh" are employed differently, as in "magajiya" (Hausa) and "mangazhiya" (Bassa). Other examples of these differences include variations in the use of "d" and "zh", "a" and "o", "o" and "u", "a" and "u", "l" and "n", "k" and "gb", and "o" and "wo".

== Occupation ==
The Bassa people are primarily farmers, cultivating crops such as yams, millet, guinea corn, and maize. In addition to farming, they also engage in fishing and livestock rearing. The Bassa are skilled artisans, specializing in weaving and pottery, particularly the molding of earthen pots.

Some researchers have noted that the Bassa people, after the Fulani, are known to be semi-nomadic, frequently changing their residences in search of fertile lands for farming. This migration pattern is driven by their agricultural needs and the desire for productive farmland.

== Culture ==
The Bassa people of Nigeria have a rich cultural heritage, expressed through various traditional dances. Some notable examples include the Ugunu Cultural Festival, Ikɛ masquerade, Araga, et cetera.

These cultural dances play a significant role in Bassa tradition, serving as a means of expression, celebration, and community bonding.

== Settlement patterns and village structure ==
The Bassa people traditionally reside in small village settlements, a deliberate choice that enables them to engage in their renowned professional activities, particularly farming. The availability of land is a crucial factor in acquiring large farm plots, which is often not feasible in densely populated towns and cities where development is rapid. Consequently, the Bassa people prefer to settle in rural areas, where abundant land is available for extensive farming. By doing so, they avoid the distractions of urban life and instead, immerse themselves in their occupation, surrounded by the natural resources and incentives that promote their farming activities.

=== Village settlement ===
Bassa villages typically consist of between one and thirty family compounds, each with a unique layout pattern. These compounds are usually oblong in shape, with a backdrop of trees and shrines that connect each major compound. Families have the freedom to build their compounds as they deem fit, without interference from others.

In some cases, families may choose to establish their compounds at a distance from other village dwellers, resulting in a scenario where bush paths serve as connectors between compounds. Bassa villages are generally surrounded by bushes, with a notable feature being the "uhangwu," a sacred area housing the protective god of the village.

The uhangwu is characterized by a cluster of trees providing shade, accompanied by small shrine huts that serve as the dwelling place of the village god, Ijile.

Bassa villages are composed of small clan or family compound units. Each clan may allocate a specific area for all members of the families in the clan to erect their houses. In such villages, compounds are referred to in relation to clan groupings rather than family housing units.

In certain cases, however, each family unit has its own compound, making it possible for a clan to have many compounds scattered about the different parts of the village.

=== Village nomenclature ===
In Bassa tradition, villages are identified by unique names, which are derived from various sources. These names serve as a means of identification, distinction, and commemoration.

Founders' names: One common practice is to name a village after its founder, the person who first cleared the land and established settlement. This naming convention is a way to honor and immortalize the founder, ensuring their legacy lives on even after they pass away. Examples of villages named after their founders include Dangara, Ushiyigo, and Udaku. Notably, these names are typically derived from male founders, as men are often credited with establishing villages.

Clan names: Bassa villages may also be named after the clan that first settled in the area. For instance, if a member of the Ashashama clan founded a village, it might be named Ashashama. This practice is evident in villages like Ugwushi, Utundo, and Ashashama, which bear the names of the clans that initially settled there.

Founding statements: In some cases, the first statements made by founders upon arriving at the site of their new village are used as the village name. For example, if a founder exclaimed "N jiye" (I have come home), the village might be named Njiye now referred to as Toto. Other examples include Rubochi and Kenyefu.

Geographical Features: Village names may also be derived from the physical environment and geographical features surrounding the village. For instance, a village built on a flat piece of land might be named accordingly (Ndausu) while a village situated on rocky ground, like Akpakpata, might bear a name reflecting its unique geography.

Prominent features and landmarks: Bassa villages may be named after prominent features, landmarks, or abundant resources in the area. Examples include village names like Awawa and O'wubwo, which are derived from the names of trees found in the vicinity. Similarly, the village name Gebi is named after the leopards that once inhabited the area.

Economic activities: In some cases, village names reflect the economic activities or occupations of their inhabitants. For example, the village of Ugba Ukunu (also known as Gbokunu) might have been named after the production and sale of ukunu (sweet gruel) that was prevalent in the area.

=== Compound settlements and social structure ===
The Bassa people traditionally reside in compound settlements, which can range from a single clan or family compound to larger villages comprising up to thirty small compound units. These compounds are typically large, with houses built in either a round or rectangular shape, depending on the type of houses constructed. Within each compound, the most elderly man serves as the head of the family, responsible for the day-to-day administration and spiritual leadership. He performs sacrifices and other traditional functions, such as child naming ceremonies, on behalf of all family members.

Bassa houses are constructed from mud bricks, with thatched grass roofs. Round houses, which are the more traditional type, have roofs made on the ground and then lifted onto the house by able-bodied men. Rectangular houses, on the other hand, have roofs made directly on top of the house.

In Bassa culture, communal living and sharing are essential aspects of family life. Women are allocated separate houses within the compound, and each family cooks and eats together. Men and women have separate areas for eating, with men gathering at the umwamwa and women at the courtyard.

Umuamua: The Men's Gathering Place is a sacred place reserved for men, where they receive visitors, settle family disputes, and perform sacrifices to the family or clan gods. Women are generally excluded from this area, especially during sacrifices and when menstruating.

Women have their own gathering places, such as the udulo or ugbahu, where they relax, cook, and socialize. These huts are typically built in the center of the compound or between houses.

A typical Bassa compound includes various facilities, such as:

- Izhɛrɛ: a hut containing grinding stones for women to grind corn and other crops.
- Ukpe: a place where women pound guinea-corn, millet, and other crops.
- Ubizo: a refuse dump where all waste from the compound is discarded.
- Bathing areas: often located at the back of the compound, where people bathe in the open.

Expansion of Compounds: as populations grow, compounds can be extended to reduce congestion. This allows clans to have multiple family compounds within a village, ensuring sufficient space for all members.

=== Compound names ===
In Bassa tradition, compounds are identified and referred to by specific names, which are derived from two primary sources: the name of the clan and the name of the family head.

Clan-based - When a clan's members build their houses together in the same compound area, the compound is named after the clan. Examples of such compound names include the Ozongulo Compound, the Edigeshi Compound, and the Arusameshe Compound. This naming convention reflects the strong clan ties and social bonds within the Bassa community.

Family-based - In cases where compounds are built on a family basis rather than clan clusters, the compound is named after the family head. The family head's name becomes the identifier for the compound, as seen in examples such as the Compound of Kure, the Compound of Jere, and the Compound of Sheneni. Typically, the man whose name is used is the eldest and most respected member of the family.

The Bassa settlement pattern is characterized by small, intimate villages that foster social interactions and friendliness. Each person is well-known, and community members collectively address individual problems. The spatial layout of the villages, with each person having their own house or room, ensures a balance between community and individual privacy.

Spiritual protection: The villages are protected by numerous deities and gods, with Ijile being the most prominent. This spiritual protection is an integral aspect of Bassa culture and social structure, reinforcing the sense of community and shared identity.

== Notable people ==
- Ahmad Garba Gunna, the Emir of Kagara, Niger State, Rafi LGA, Niger State, Nigeria
- HRM Williams Keke, the Agụma of Bassa, Bassa, Kogi State
- Alhaji Idris Alhassan Yusuf Tawari, the Agụma of Tawari, Nigeria, Koton Karfe LGA, Kogi State
- HRH Alhaji Muhammadu Magaji, the Agụma of Gwagwalada, Gwagwalada Area Council, FCT, Nigeria
- HRH Dr. David Wodi Tukura, the Agụma of Turunku Chiefdom 1, Toto, Nigeria, Nasarawa State, Nigeria
- HRH Alhaji Adamu Saba, the Agụma of Gbameni (Gwomani), Kwali-Abuja.
