= Umu =

Umu or UMU may refer to:

== Universities ==
- Umeå University, Sweden
- United Methodist University, Liberia
- University of Manchester Union, England
- University of Murcia, Spain
- State University of New York Upstate Medical University, United States
- University of Mount Union, United States

== Other uses ==
- A variety of earth ovens in Polynesia, including:
  - Māori umu tī, used to cook Cordyline australis and other varieties of Cordyline with similar large tap roots.
  - Māori hāngī, also called umu in Samoa, especially in older texts
- Universal Monetary Unit, created by the International Monetary Fund

== See also ==
- Yumu (disambiguation)
