= BQX =

BQX or bqx may refer to:

- Brooklyn–Queens Connector, a proposed streetcar line in New York City
- bqx, the ISO 639-3 code for Baangi language, Nigeria
