= Damakawa =

The Damakawa are an ethnic group of about 500-1000 people in northwest Nigeria. They live in three villages near Maganda in Sakaba Local Government Area, Kebbi State. They used to speak the Damakawa language, but have now shifted to C'Lela.

== Climate ==
Kebbi is characterised by tropical weather that is cold, damp, and harmattan, similar to other states in Nigeria. The average annual rainfall in Kebbi is 787.53 mm and 112.21 mm. This is so that agricultural output can benefit from the state's climatic resource of rainfall. The state's dry season lasts seven months, and the rainy season lasts from mid-May to mid-September. The year-round temperature of Kebbi ranges from 650°F to 1040°F. In Kebbi, the cloud cover is typically 68% per year between March and November, with the clouds becoming clearer from November to the month after, March. Each year, the seven months from April to November are comparatively damp, with the windiest months being November to July.
