= Yauri, Nigeria =

- LGA and town
- Interactive map of Yauri, Nigeria
- Country: Nigeria
- State: Kebbi State

Area
  - Total: 3,380 km^{2} (1,310 sq mi)

Population (1972)
  - Total: 112,000
  - Density: 33.1/km^{2} (85.8/sq mi)
- Time zone: UTC+1 (WAT)

Yauri is a town and Local Government Area in Kebbi State, northwestern Nigeria. It is the location of the Yauri Emirate, one of the smallest historical emirates in Northern Nigeria. In 1972, the population of the division was about 112,000 people inhabiting a land area of about 3,380 square kilometres (1,306 sq mi) and scattered over six major districts.

== Demographics ==
Yauri's ethnic groups include Shangawa, Gungawa, Dukawa, Kamberi, Hausa people, Nupe, Yoruba and Kanuri. However, the predominance of Hausa's in the socio-political structure of northern Nigeria has gradually increased the transformation of some of the dominant ethnic groups in Yauri to become Hausanized. Today, the Hausa people constitute the governing class of Yauri.

The Reshe people consider Yauri to be their ancient city.

Today, the Hausa language is the main language.

== Climate ==
The rainy season is usually between June and October, however, rain sometimes starts in April or May. During the rainy season most farmers favor harvesting their crops, planting crops and repairing the farms. Festivals and commemoration dominates the rainy season calendar. Harmattan is the other season
