= Basa-Gumna language =

Extinct Kainji language of Nigeria

Basa-Gumna
- Basa Kuta, Basa-Kaduna, Gwadara Basa
- Native to: Nigeria
- Region: Chanchaga
- Extinct: by 1987
- Language family: Niger–Congo?: Atlantic–Congo; Benue–Congo; Kainji; Basa; Kontagora–Gumna; Basa-Gumna

Language codes
- ISO 639-3: bsl
- Glottolog: basa1280

Basa-Gumna (also known as Basa Kuta, Basa-Kaduna or Gwadara Basa) is an extinct Kainji language of Nigeria. It was spoken in Chanchaga, Niger state, and Nasarawa, near the Basa homeland. Speakers have shifted to Hausa.

Gumna is situated about 10 kilometers to the west of the Tegina-Zungeru road. Around 1963, Basa-Gumna speakers moved to the road and currently live in Yakila town, where only two semi-speakers were found in 1986. They also live two nearby hamlets, both called Basa, which are located west of the road.
