= Gurmana language =

Kainji language of Nigeria

Gurmana
- Native to: Nigeria
- Region: Shiroro LGA, Niger State
- Native speakers: (3,000 cited 1989)
- Language family: Niger–Congo?: Atlantic–Congo; Benue–Congo; Kainji; Shiroro; Gurmana–Rin; Gurmana

Language codes
- ISO 639-3: gvm
- Glottolog: gurm1246
- ELP: Gurmana

Gurmana is a Kainji language of Gurmana village in Shiroro LGA, Niger State, Nigeria. There are no more than 2,000 to 3,000 speakers in Gurmana village and nearby hamlets.
