= Tawari, Nigeria =

Community in Kogi State

Tawari
- Community
- Location in Nigeria
- Coordinates: 8.25333°N 6.88556°E
- Country: Nigeria
- State: Kogi State

Government
  - Traditional Ruler: Alhaji Idris Alhassan Yusuf Tawari
- Time zone: UTC+1 (WAT)

Tawari is a community of the Bassa people, Nigeria located in Kogi State, Nigeria, approximately 100 kilometers (62 miles) south of Abuja, the capital city of Nigeria.

Tawari is situated near Gegu town, along the Lokoja-Abuja highway. The traditional ruler of the Tawari community is the Aguma of Tawari, currently held by Alhaji Idris Alhassan Yusuf Tawari. The community is also home to other tribes like Gbagyi and Hausa.

== History of Tawari ==
Tawari is the name of a person. That person was a warrior-king. As confirmed by the 1922 Report Number 5 of the colonial administration, compiled by Mr. C. R. Niven, Tawari was the son of Zabia - also a warrior-king - who was the first ruler of an area that includes the place now known as Tawari City.
