= Jibrin Ndagi Baba =

Nigerian politician

Honorable Jibrin Ndagi Baba

Deputy speaker of the Niger State House of Assembly
- Incumbent
- Assumed office 23 July 2020
- Preceded by: Bako Kassim Alfa
- Constituency: Lavun constituency

Personal details
- Born: 1979 (age 47) Niger State, Nigeria
- Occupation: legislature

Jibrin Ndagi Baba (born 1979) is a politician and member Niger State House of Assembly representing Lavun constituency at the State legislative level. He succeeded Bako Kasim Alfa as the deputy speaker of the Niger State House of Assembly after he announced his resignation as the deputy speaker with an un-disclosed reasons.

He was nominated as the successor of Bako Kasim Alfa by Gambo Sulaiman Rabiu of Paikoro Constituency and seconded by Saleh Ibrahim Alhaji of Kontagora II constituency.

== July 23, 2020 plenary session meeting ==
Jibrin Baba was on 23 July 2020 at plenary session Thursday meeting, raised the motion of the two new elected majority leader and it deputy to be removed from the position due to lack of confidence as being member holding two principal office.
