= Gwamhi-Wuri language =

Kainji language of Nigeria

Gwamhi-Wuri
- Lyase
- Lyase-Ne
- Native to: Nigeria
- Region: Kebbi, Niger State
- Native speakers: (16,000 cited 2000)
- Language family: Niger–Congo?: Atlantic–Congo; Benue–Congo; Kainji; Northwest Kainji; Gwamhi-Wuri

Language codes
- ISO 639-3: bga
- Glottolog: gwam1244
- ELP: Gwamhi-Wuri

Gwamhi
- Person: wa-Gwamhi
- People: a-Gwamhi

Wuri
- Person: wa-Wuri
- People: a-Wuri

Gwamhi-Wuri (Wurə-Gwamhyə-Mba), or Lyase, is a Kainji language of Nigeria. There are three varieties which have only slight differences. "Lyase-Ne" means "mother tongue". The Mba people, known in Hausa as Kokanawa, were recently reported by Blench (2012).

== Names ==
Names for the languages and peoples:

| One person | The people | The language | Hausa name |
|---|---|---|---|
| wa-Wəri | a-Wəri | d-Wəri | Wurawa |
| wa-Gwamhyə | a-Gwamhyə | d-Gwamhyə | Gwamfawa |
| wa-Mba | a-Mba | ? | Kokanawa |
