= U̠t-Ma'in language =

Northwest Kainji dialect continuum of Nigeria

Ut Main
- Native to: Nigeria
- Region: Kebbi State, Niger State, Sokoto State, Zamfara State
- Native speakers: (36,000 cited 1992)
- Language family: Niger–Congo?: Atlantic–Congo; Benue–Congo; Kainji; Northwest Kainji; Ut Main

Language codes
- ISO 639-3: gel
- Glottolog: kagf1238

u̠t-Ma'in or Fakai is a Northwest Kainji dialect continuum spoken by 36,000 people in Nigeria. (The letter ⟨u̠⟩ is /ə/.) There are numerous rather divergent dialects:

- Kag (Puku, Fakanchi, Et-Kag)
- Jiir (Gelanchi, Et-Jiir)
- Kur (Kere, Kar, Keri-Ni, Kelli-Ni, Kelanchi, Kelinci)
- Zuksun (Zussun, Et-Zuksun)
- Ror (Et-Maror, Tudanchi, Er-Gwar)
- Fer (Fere, Et-Fer, Wipsi-Ni, Kukum)
- Us (Et-Us)
- Koor (Kulu)

== Names ==
Names for the u̠t-Ma'in peoples and languages from Blench (2012):

Hausa name	c-Lela name	People	Language
Fakkawa	Pək-nu	Kag-ne	ǝt-Kag
Fakkawa	Pək-nu	əs-Us	ǝt-Us
Gelawa	Geeri-ni	a-Jiir	ǝt-Jiir
Zuksun	Wipsi-ni	a-Zuksun	ǝt-Zuksun
Kukumawa	Wipsi-ni	əs-Fer	ǝt-Fer
Kelawa	Keri-ni	Kər-ni	ǝt-Kər
Tuduwa	ǝd-Gwan	a-Ror	ǝt-ma-Ror
Kuluwa	?	a-Koor	ǝt-ma-Koor

== Geographic distribution ==
The Ut-Ma'in language is spoken mainly in Kebbi State (especially Fakai) and Sokoto State (Kebbe) but also in Niger State (Kontagora) and Zamfara State.
