= New Bussa =

New Bussa is a town in Niger State, Nigeria. It is the new site of Bussa after the Kainji Lake dam set the previous location underwater. As of 2007 New Bussa had an estimated population of 24,449. New Bussa is the headquarters of the Borgu Emirate and the Borgu Local Government Area.

== Geography ==
New Bussa sits at 9°53′N 4°31′E, and the original town of Bussa was located about 40 km North of New Bussa at 10°13′51″N 4°28′31″E (altitude 561 ft or 170 metres).
