= Niger State House of Assembly =

Legislative arm of the government of Niger State of Nigeria

The Niger State House of Assembly is the legislative arm of the government of Niger State of Nigeria. It is a unicameral legislature with 27 members elected from the 25 local government areas of the state. Local government areas with considerable lager population are delineated into two constituencies to give equal representation. This makes the number of legislators in the Niger State House of Assembly 27.

The fundamental functions of the Assembly are to enact new laws, amend or repeal existing laws and oversight of the executive. Members of the assembly are elected for a term of four years concurrent with federal legislators (Senate and House of Representatives).

The state assembly convenes three times a week (Tuesdays, Wednesdays and Thursdays) for plenary sessions in the assembly complex within the state capital, Minna. Committees and oversight functions are held as determined by the members.

Honourable Abdullahi Wuse and Bako Kassim Alfa as speaker and deputy speaker. Bako Kasim who is elected together with the speaker the same day resign his position as the deputy speaker of Assembly with an undisclosed reason and Jibrin Baba of Lavun constituency is nominated as the deputy speaker.

== List of representatives ==
- Kabiru Takuti, representing Chanchaga Chief Whip
- Abdulmalik Sarkindaji, representing Mariga, Speaker
- Bako Kassim Alfa, representing Bida I
- Jibrin Ndagi Baba, representing Lavun,
- Alhaji Isma'il Zubairu Pandogari (PDP), representing Rafi, (Kagara)
- Mohammed Bashir Lokogoma, representing Wushishi.
- Hussaini Ibrahim (APC), representing Agaie
- Bello Bako (APC), representing Rijau
- Musa Alhaji Sule (APC), representing Katcha,
- Mohammed Abba Bala (APC), representing Borgu
- Afinike Dauda (APC), representing Gurara, Deputy Speaker
- Nasiru Paiko (APC), representing Paiko

== Photo Gallery ==
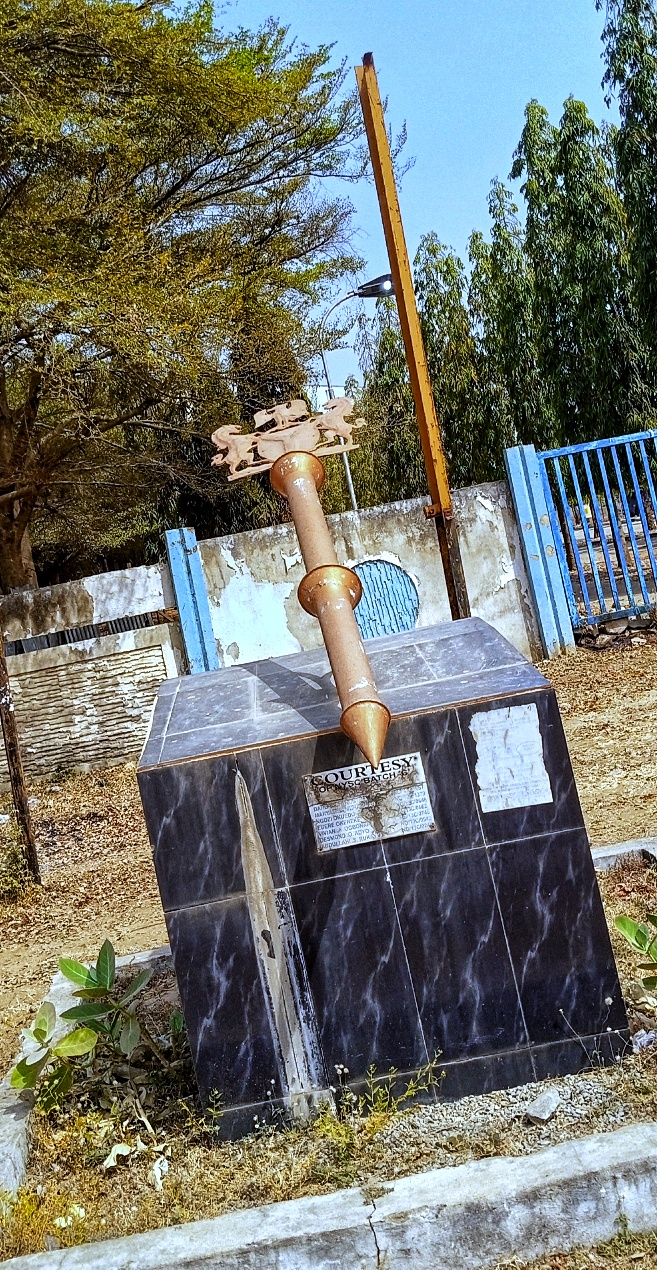

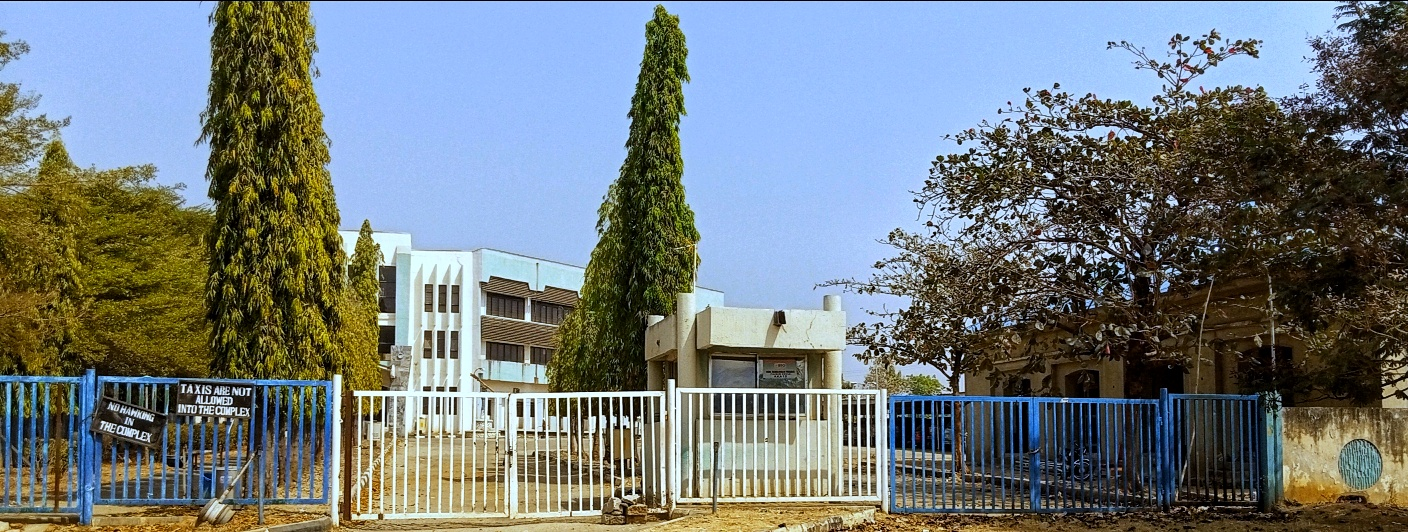

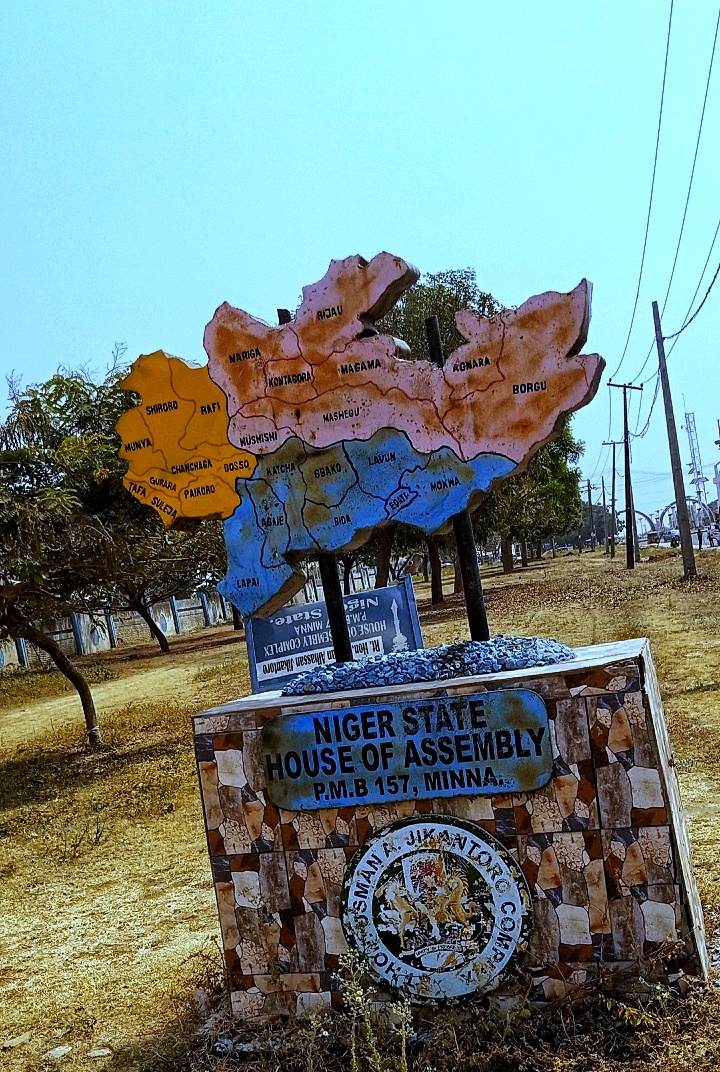

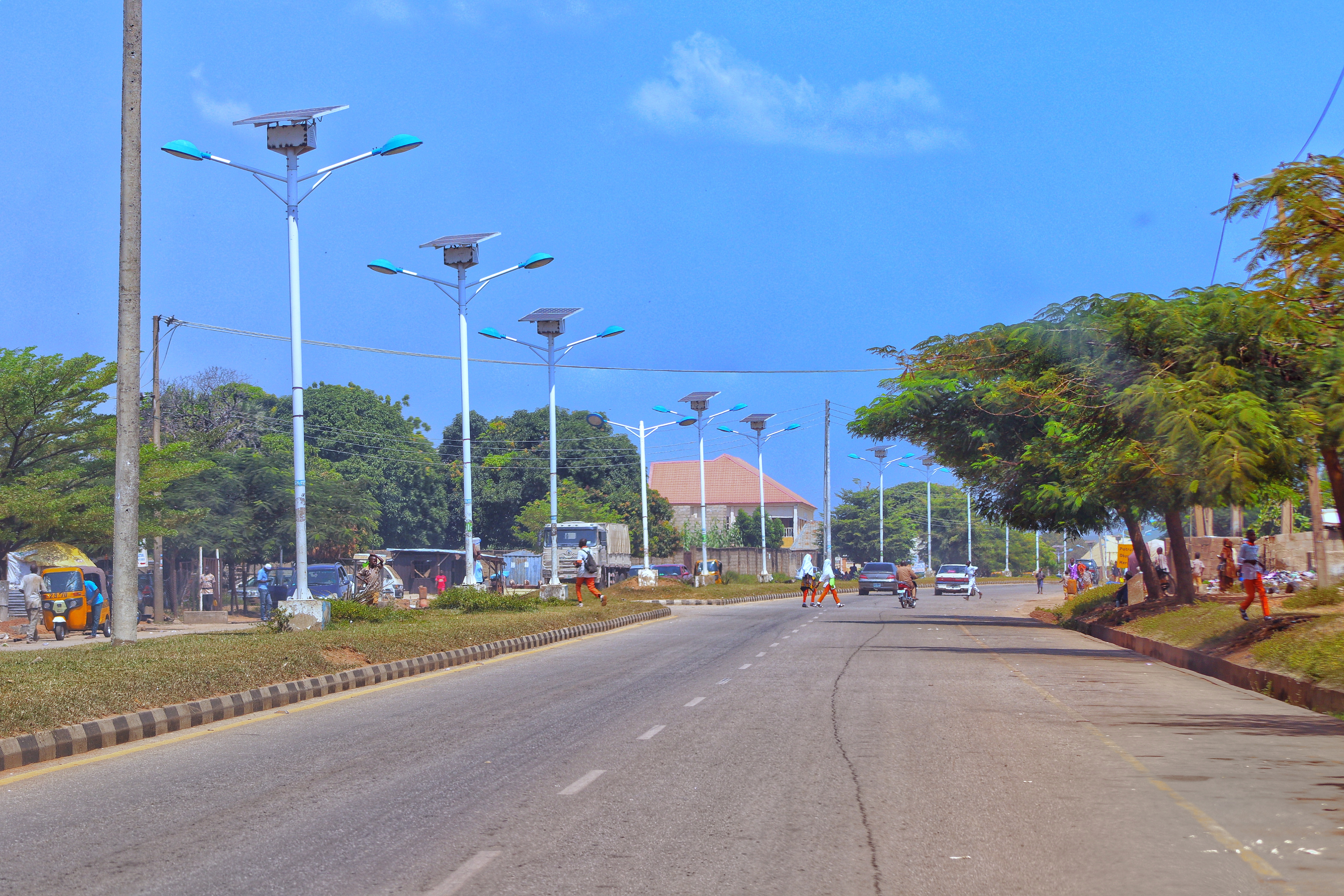
