= Cipu language =

Kainji language spoken in Nigeria

Cicipu
- Acipanci
- 'Cicipu'
- Native to: Nigeria
- Region: Kebbi State, Niger State
- Native speakers: (20,000 cited 1995)
- Language family: Niger–Congo?: Benue–Congo; Kainji; Kambari-Cicipu; Cicipu

Language codes
- ISO 639-3: awc
- Glottolog: cici1237
- ELP: Cicipu

Cipu
- Person: Cipu
- People: Acipu
- Language: Cicipu

Cicipu is a Kainji language spoken by about 20,000 people in northwest Nigeria. The people call themselves Acipu and are called Acipawa in Hausa.

Like most Benue–Congo languages, Cicipu has a complex noun class system. It has a fairly complex phonology with lexical and grammatical tone, vowel harmony and nasalisation.

Virtually all Cicipu speakers speak the lingua franca Hausa. Many also speak other nearby languages.

== Classification ==
Cicipu is part of the Kambari branch of the Niger–Congo languages.

The most recent published classification has Cicipu as part of the Kamuku group of West Kainji. However more detailed studies have shown this to be unlikely.

== Alternative names ==
The Ethnologue used to list Cicipu as 'Western Acipa'. In Hausa the language is referred to as Acipanci and the people as Acipawa.

== Geographic distribution ==
Cicipu is spoken in Nigeria by approximately 20,000 people, split between Sakaba Local Government Area, Kebbi State and Kontagora Local Government Area, Niger State.

=== Dialects/Varieties ===
The Acipu themselves recognise seven distinct varieties of Cicipu. The dialect names are as follows (with the corresponding Hausa names in parentheses):

- Tirisino (Karishen)
- Tidipo (Kadonho)
- Tizoriyo (Mazarko)
- Tidodimo (Kadedan)
- Tikula (Maburya)
- Ticuhun (Kakihum)
- Tikumbasi (Kumbashi)

== Phonology ==
The most common syllable type in Cicipu is CV, although there are fairly strong arguments for N and CVN. A small number of noun and verb roots begin with a V syllable. Lexical tone contrasts are found in nouns e.g. káayá ‘house’ and káayà ‘bean’, but not in verbs (although grammatical tone is important for verbs).

=== Vowels ===
Vowel chart of the Tirisino dialect of Cicipu

Cicipu has an asymmetric six-vowel system. All vowels can be long or short, and all have nasalised counterparts. There are four diphthongs: /ei/, /eu/, /ai/, and /au/.

Monophthongs
	Front	Central	Back
Close	i,iː		u,uː
Close-mid	e,eː		o,oː
Open-mid			ɔ,ɔː
Open		a,aː	

=== Consonants ===
Consonant length is contrastive in Cicipu, e.g. yuwo 'fall' vs. yuwwo 'turn around'. Any consonant may be lengthened.

Consonant phonemes
		Labial	Dental or alveolar	Postalveolar or palatal	Velar		Glottal		
		Labial	Dental or alveolar	Postalveolar or palatal	Plain	Labialized	Palatalized	Plain	Labialized
Plosives and affricates	Voiceless	p	t	tʃ	k	kʷ	ʔʲ	ʔ	ʔʷ
Plosives and affricates	Voiced	b	d	dʒ	ɡ	ɡʷ			
Plosives and affricates	Implosive	ɓ	ɗ						
Fricatives	Voiceless		s				hʲ	h	hʷ
Fricatives	Voiced	v	z						
Nasals		m	n						
Rhotic			ɾ						
Approximants			l	j		w			

== Vocabulary ==
A large number of Cicipu words are borrowings from the lingua franca Hausa. The pronunciation of many of these loanwords has changed to fit in with Cicipu phonology, in particular with respect to vowel harmony.

== Writing system ==
Cicipu is not currently written, although a preliminary orthography proposal has been made, and a small number of trial books has been circulated.

== See also ==
- Journal of West African Languages
