= Pandogari =

- Town/ward
- Nickname: garin su ta'allah
- Motto: Garin da babu ɓarawo
- Location in Nigeria
- Coordinates: 10°24′0″N 6°25′0″E
- Country: Nigeria
- State: Niger State
- LGA: Rafi
- Time zone: UTC+1 (WAT)
- 3-digit postal code prefix: 922

Pandogari is a town (ward) in Kagara, the capital of Rafi local government in Niger State, Nigeria. There is a large hill which is called Kongoma Hill, in Fulfulde (Kwangwamaje), Kongoma hill located at the eastern Pandogari, while on the northern part, the town shared land with Kusharki district, while on the eastern/southern it shared land with Ringa district.The distance from the state capital Minna to Pandogari is about 156.7 km. Pandogari central is headed by a district head called Hakimi in Hausa language, and the current Hakimi of Kongoma is Alhaji Idris Aliyu Jibril. There are three major languages in Pandogari town; they are Hausa, Fulani, Ɓurawa and kamuku. In 2016, there was a religious conflict between Muslims and Christians in Pandogari which resulted in the death of four people, including a 24 year old young student.

== Places near Pandogari ==
Places near Pandogari are:

- Ringa
- Gidan awane
- Gidan buhari
- Gidan damao
- Gidan kurao
- Gidan madawakin tugulbi
- Gidan maigari boka
- Gidan maikarfi
- Gidan maizaji
- Gidan sarkin uguru
- Gidan sarkin Uran chiki
- Gidan shabagu
- Gidan tanko
- Gidan tetige
- Gidan ushiba
- Gidan wusheynu

== Distances from pandogari to other cities in Nigeria ==
- Pandogari - Minna 156.7 km
- Pandogari - Lagos 551 km
- Pandogari - Abia 565 km
- Pandogari - Ogun 470 km
- Pandogari - Kano 290 km
- Pandogari - Ibadan 435 km
- Pandogari - Kaduna 113 km
- Pandogari - Port Harcourt 627 km
- Pandogari - Benin 460 km
- Pandogari - Maiduguri 753 km
- Pandogari - Zaria 159 km
- Pandogari - Aba 597 km
- Pandogari - Jos 277 km
- Pandogari - Iorin 294 km
- Pandogari - Oyo 393 km
- Pandogari - Enugu 457 km
- Pandogari - Abeokuta 494 km
- Pandogari - Sokoto 322 km
- Pandogari - Onitsha 473 km
- Pandogari - Warri 548 km
- Pandogari - Oshogbo 356 km
- Pandogari - Okene 318 km
- Pandogari - Calabar 641 km
- Pandogari - Katsina 316 km

== Notable people in Pandogari ==
- Imam Habib Lawal (Chief Imam of Jama'atul Izalatul Bidi'a Wa'iƙamatus Sunnah, Pandogari)
- Alhaji Idris Aliyu (Head of Pandogari district)
- Alhaji Ado Tela (business man)
- Alhaji Aminu Wayo (business man)
- Alhaji Salisu mai wake (business man)
- Muhammad Bagobiri (Islamic Religion Instructor Tijaniyyah)
- Late Alhaji Aliyu Ahmad Bafillace Ringa (Islamic Religion Instructor and Fulani leader)
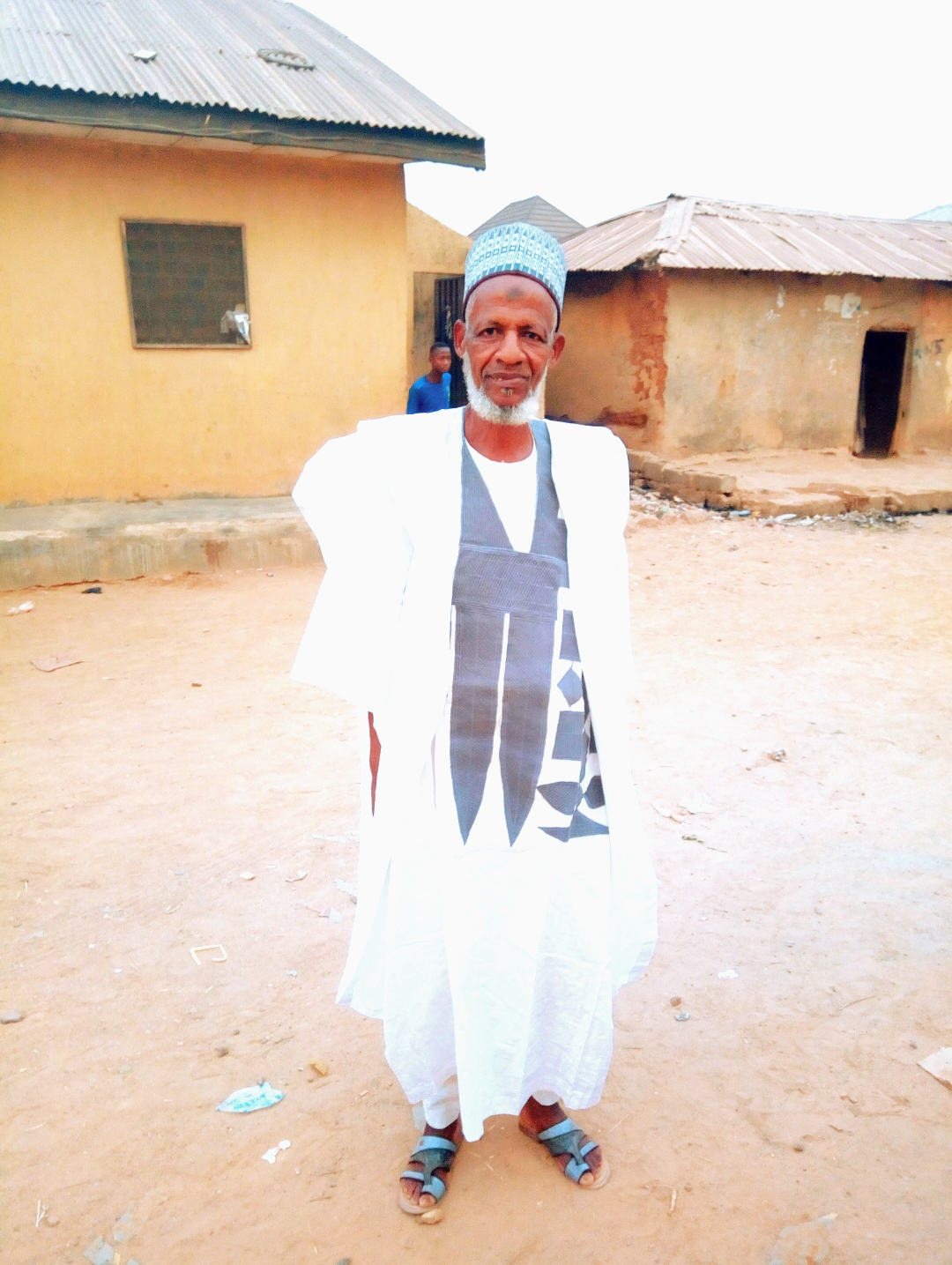
  Late Alhaji Aliyu Ahmad Bafillace
- Alhaji Abubakar Jibo Garba (Madakin Kagara Emirate)
- Late Alhaji Sama'ila Hayin Sarki (Farmer)
- Alhaji Zubairu Isma'il (Member representing Rafi at Niger State House of Assembly)
- Mamman Dogo (politician/Councilor Pandogari)

== Notable Areas within Pandogari ==
- Government Day Secondary School Pandogari
- Mamman Kwantagora Technical College Pandogari
- Central Primary School Pandogari
- Kyareke Primary Health Care Pandogari
