= Kimba language =

Kainji language group of Nigeria

Kimba
- Tsikimba
- Native to: Nigeria
- Region: Niger State
- Ethnicity: Kambari
- Native speakers: 100,000 (2004)
- Language family: Niger–Congo?: Benue–Congo; Kainji; Kambari; Kimba
- Dialects: Kimba (Tsikimba); Gaushi (Agaushi); Wenci (Ngwunci)

Language codes
- ISO 639-3: kdl
- Glottolog: tsik1238

Kimba
- People: Akimba
- Language: Tsɨkimba

Gaushi
- People: Agaushi
- Language: Tsɨgaushi

Wənci
- Person: Mawunci
- People: Ŋwənci
- Language: Tsuwənci

The Kimba languages (Tsikimba or the Kambari II languages) are a group of Kainji languages of Nigeria spoken by the Kambari people. The languages are Kimba (Tsikimba), Gaushi (Agaushi), and Wenci (Ngwunci).

== Languages ==
There are three languages: Kimba (Tsikimba), Gaushi (Agaushi), and Wənci (Ngwunci). Roger Blench considers Gaushi (Agaushi, Ashe) and Wenci (Ngwunci) to be distinct languages.

The Kimba language (Tsikimba) has three dialects: Auna, Yumu and Wara.

The Ngwunci language has two dialects: Agwara (tsu-saweni) and Rofia (tsu-ɓʷəshi). The Kimba language (Tsikimba) is spoken in Niger State (Magama, Mashigu, and Mariga LGA's, Auna and Wara Areas, East of Lake Kainji on the Niger River) and Kebbi State (Ngaski LGA, Southwest of Lake Kainji).
