= Northwest Kainji languages =

Northwest Kainji
- Lela, Duka
- Geographic distribution: Nigeria
- Linguistic classification: Niger–Congo?: Atlantic–Congo; Benue–Congo; Kainji; Northwest Kainji

Language codes
- ISO 639-3: –
- Glottolog: duka1247

The six Northwest Kainji languages, also known as the Lela languages or the Duka languages, are spoken near Kainji Lake on the Niger River in Nigeria. They are distinguishable from other Kainji languages by the reduction of their noun-class prefixes to single consonants.

== Classification ==
=== Blench (2018) ===
Northwest Kainji classification by Blench (2018):

- Northwest Kainji
  - ? Damakawa
    - cLela
    - Hun-Saare
    - Ma'in, Wurə-Gwamhyə-Mba

The position of Damakawa is uncertain.

=== Blench (2010) ===
In Blench (2010), Lela (C'lela and Ribah) is divergent from the other languages, though poorly attested Damakawa has similarities.

- Northwest Kainji
  - Lela (C'lela), ? Damakawa
    - Gwamhi-Wuri
    - ut-Ma'in (Fakai), Hun-Saare (Duka)
