= Shiroro languages =

Language family

Shiroro
- Pongu
- Geographic distribution: Nigeria
- Linguistic classification: Niger–Congo?: Atlantic–Congo; Benue–Congo; Kainji; Shiroro

Language codes
- ISO 639-3: –
- Glottolog: shir1275

The Shiroro languages, also known as the Pongu languages, form a branch of the Kainji languages of Nigeria. They are spoken near Shiroro Lake.

== Languages ==
There are four basic divisions within Shiroro:

- Pongu (Rin) cluster, Gurmana
- Baushi cluster, Fungwa (Ura)

The Baushi language cluster constitutes half a dozen languages.
