= Pongu language =

Language of Nigeria

Pongu
- Rin
- Tə-rĩ
- Native to: Nigeria
- Region: Niger State
- Native speakers: 30,000 (2003)
- Language family: Niger–Congo?: Atlantic–Congo; Benue–Congo; Kainji; Shiroro; Gurmana–Rin; Pongu
- Dialects: Rin; Wəgə

Language codes
- ISO 639-3: png
- Glottolog: pong1250
- ELP: Pongu

Pongu (Rin)
- Person: Bwə-rĩ
- People: A-rĩ
- Language: Tə-rĩ

Pongu (Pangu), or Rin, is a Kainji language spoken in Nigeria. There are about 20,000 speakers. Their main centre is in Pangu Gari town of Niger State, about 20 kilometres southeast of Tegina.

== Clans ==
There are 8 Rin clans. They speak slightly different but mutually comprehensible dialects.

- Ca-su
- Ca-undu
- A-sebi
- Ca-gere = Ca-majere
- A-baba = U-bwɔbwɔ
- A-wusi = A-kwa
- A-zhiga
- A-waga = Awәgә

The Awәgә may have been a different ethnic group that was assimilated into the Rin group. Awәgә was a distinct language related to Rin, and used to be spoken in some villages to the east of Zungeru. However, today it is nearly extinct. Blench (2012) was able to record a semi-speaker in Dikko village, near Luwa town, Rafi LGA. Two fluent speakers were reported in Gidan Gambo, near Pongu Gari.

== Bibliography ==
- Dettweiler, Stephen and Sonia Dettweiler (2002) 'Sociolinguistic survey of the Pongu people', SIL Electronic Survey Reports 2002-040
