= Abdullahi Wuse =

Speaker of Niger State House of Assembly, Nigeria

Speaker of the Niger State House of Assembly
- Incumbent
- Assumed office June 2019
- Preceded by: Ahmed Marafa

Personal details
- Born: 1963 (age 62–63)
- Party: All Progressives Congress, APC

Abdullahi Bawa Wuse (born 1963) is a Nigerian legal practitioner and politician who was elected Speaker of the Niger State House of Assembly in 2019. He was elected to the state assembly for the first term in March 2019 on the platform of All Progressives Congress (APC) to represent Tafa constituency. The house standing order was waved to allow first term house members to contest in the election. Wuse was a sole candidate in the election and emerged speaker of the house through a unanimous vote following his nomination by Ahmed Mohammed Marafa who was the immediate speaker of the House.

Wuse was immediately sworn in as the speaker of the house by the clerk of the assembly Abdullahi Mohammed Kagara pledging to lead the house in accordance with the law. Wuse was Attorney General and Commissioner for Justice in the government of Governor Babangida Aliyu. Wuse was also a Chairman of Tafa Local Government.
