= Ahmed Marafa =

8th speaker of Niger state house

Speaker of the Niger State House of Assembly

Ahmed Mohammed Marafa is a Nigerian politician who was elected speaker of the 8th Niger State House of Assembly in 2015. Marafa was elected to the state assembly from Chanchaga on the platform of All Progressives Congress. He was nominated for speakership position by Bashir Lokogoma representing Wushishi Constituency and seconded by Bako Alfa from Bida North Constituency. After taking oath of office, Marafa said he would evolve meaningful legislation that would uplift the condition of the people.

In November 2015, Marafa was elected Chairman of Northern Nigeria Speakers Forum which is a body of speakers of 19 State Houses of Assembly. In the build up to 2019 election, Marafa was ridiculed by youths chanting ‘one term only’ at him. The chant meant that they do not support his re-election bid for another term in the state assembly. Four youths involved in the chant were arrested and arraigned at a Senior Magistrate Court on a three count charge of joint act, inciting disturbance and mischief.
