= Reshe language =

Kainji languages of Nigeria

Reshe
- Tsureshe
- Native to: Nigeria
- Region: Kebbi State, Niger State
- Ethnicity: Gungawa, Yaurawa (Yauri)
- Native speakers: (44,000 cited 1993)
- Language family: Niger–Congo?: Atlantic–Congo; Benue–Congo; Kainji; Reshe

Language codes
- ISO 639-3: res
- Glottolog: resh1242
- ELP: Reshe

Reshe
- People: Bareshe
- Language: Tsureshe

Reshe is the most divergent of the Kainji languages of Nigeria. It is spoken on the northern and southern sides of Kainji Lake. It is spoken in Yauri LGA, Kebbi State, and in Borgu LGA, Niger State.

Birnin Yauri (Ireshe ubinə) is the ancient city of the Reshe people and is situated about five miles east of Yelwa.
