= Baangi language =

Kainji language of Nigeria

Baangi
- Cibaangi
- Native to: Nigeria
- Region: Niger State
- Ethnicity: Kambari
- Native speakers: 28,000 (2021)
- Language family: Niger–Congo?: Benue–Congo; Kainji; Kambari; Baangi

Language codes
- ISO 639-3: bqx
- Glottolog: baan1242

Baangi
- Person: Vubaangi
- People: Abaangi
- Language: Cibaangi

Baangi is a Kainji language of Nigeria spoken by the Kambari people.
