= Vadi language =

Kainji language spoken in Nigeria

Vadi
- tsɨVaɗi
- Native to: Nigeria
- Region: Niger State
- Ethnicity: Kambari
- Native speakers: 130,000 (2011)
- Language family: Niger–Congo?: Benue–Congo; Kainji; Kambari; Vadi

Language codes
- ISO 639-3: tvd Tsuvadi
- Glottolog: tsuv1239
- ELP: Tsuvadi

Vaɗi
- People: Avaɗi
- Language: Tsɨvaɗi

Gaɗi
- People: Agaɗi
- Language: Tsɨgaɗi

The Vadi language (Tsuvadi), is a Kainji language of Nigeria spoken by the Kambari people.

Kakihum (or Gadi, Gaɗi), is a dialect.

== Phonology ==
=== Consonants ===
		Labial	Alveolar		Palatal	Velar			Glottal		
		Labial	plain	pal.	Palatal	plain	pal.	lab.	plain	pal.	lab.
Nasal		m	n	nʲ	(ɲ)	(ŋ)					
Plosive	voiceless	p	t			k	kʲ	kʷ	ʔ	ʔʲ	ʔʷ
Plosive	voiced	b	d			ɡ	ɡʲ	ɡʷ			
Plosive	implosive	ɓ	ɗ								
Affricate	voiceless		t͡s		t͡ʃ						
Affricate	voiced		d͡z		d͡ʒ						
Fricative	voiceless	(f)	s		ʃ				h	hʲ	hʷ
Fricative	voiced	v	z		ʒ						
Tap/Trill			ɾ ~ r	ɾʲ							
Approximant			l	lʲ	j			w			

- /f/ only rarely occurs.
- /ɾ/ can be heard as either a tap [ɾ] or a trill [r] in free variation.
- /n/ as a homorganic nasal, can be heard as palatal [ɲ] when preceding a palatal or post-alveolar consonant, and as velar [ŋ] when preceding a velar or glottal consonant.
- /nʲ/ may also be heard as a palatal nasal [ɲ].

=== Vowels ===
	Front		Central		Back	
	oral	nasal	oral	nasal	oral	nasal
High	i iː	ĩ ĩː	(ɨ ɨː)	(ɨ̃ ɨ̃ː)	u uː	ũ ũː
High-mid					o oː	õ õː
Low-mid	ɛ ɛː	ɛ̃ ɛ̃ː			ɔ ɔː	ɔ̃ ɔ̃ː
Low			a aː	ã ãː		

- The status of [ɨ] is only heard as an alternate of sounds /i, u/ within speech, as well as its lengthened and nasalized equivalents.
- The sounds of /ɛ, ɛ̃, ɛː, ɛ̃ː/ may be heard as more close-mid [e, ẽ, eː, ẽː] across dialects.
