= Yumu =

Yumu may refer to:

- Yumu people, an ethnic group of Australia
- Yumu language (Australia)
- Yumu language (Nigeria)
- Yumu Kudo, Japanese footballer
