= Ahmad Garba Gunna =

Emir of Kagara

Alhaji Ahmad Garba Gunna
- Attahiru II

Emir of Kagara
- Reign: 2021 – present
- Coronation: 7 April 2021
- Predecessor: Alhaji Salihu Tanko
- Born: Ahmad Garba Gunna; 1 January 1975 (age 51); Yakila, Gunna, Rafi Niger State, Nigeria
- Father: Garba Gunna
- Religion: Islam
- Occupation: Civil Servant

Alhaji Ahmad Garba Gunna (born 1 January 1975) is the current Emir of Kagara Emirate, assuming the position on 7 April 2021, succeeding Alhaji Salihu Tanko. Gunna's ascension as the Emir followed the demise of his predecessor, Alhaji Salihu Tanko, on 2 March 2021.

== Education ==
Gunna's early education began at Gandun Albasa Primary School before continuing to Government Day Secondary School Sharada, both located in Kano. He pursued higher education at Kebbi State Polytechnic, specializing in Public Administration. Subsequently, he attained a BSc in Mathematics from the Federal University Abuja. Following his education, he served in Kwara State.

Professionally, he served within the Niger State Revenue Board, notably holding the position of acting chairman of the board.

== Personal life ==
Alhaji Ahmad Garba Gunna is married and has four children.
