= Hun-Saare language =

Nigerian language

Hun-Saare
- Duka
- Native to: Nigeria
- Region: Kebbi State, Niger State
- Native speakers: (73,000 cited 1985)
- Language family: Niger–Congo?: Atlantic–Congo; Benue–Congo; Kainji; Northwest Kainji; Hun-Saare
- Dialects: Hun; Saare

Language codes
- ISO 639-3: Either: uss – Us-Saare uth – Ut-Hun
- Glottolog: huns1239

Hun-Saare or Duka is a Kainji language of Nigeria. The eastern and western dialects are known as Hun (Ut-Hun) and Saare (Us-Saare), but speakers use Saare for both.
