= Rafi, Nigeria =

Rafi
- LGA
- Interactive map of Rafi
- Location in Nigeria
- Coordinates: 10°11′04″N 6°15′12″E
- Country: Nigeria
- State: Niger State
- Headquarter: Kagara
- Established on: 1976

Government
  - Local Government Chairman and the Head of the Local Government Council: Gambo Abubakar Bojo (former) Current_Leader = Samaila Dan Modibo

Area
  - Total: 3,680 km^{2} (1,420 sq mi)

Population (2006 census)
  - Total: 181,929
  - Density: 49.4/km^{2} (128/sq mi)
- Time zone: UTC+1 (WAT)
- 3-digit postal code prefix: 922
- ISO 3166 code: NG.NI.RA

Rafi is a Local Government Area in Niger State, Nigeria. Its headquarters are in the town of Kagara on the A125 highway. The southern border of the area is the Kaduna River. Towns in the LGA include Tegina, and Pandogari.

It has an area of 3,680 km^{2} and a population of 181,929 at the 2006 census.

The postal code of the area is 922.

== Climate condition ==
Rafi LGA (headquarters in Kagara) experiences a tropical wet-and-dry climate typical of central Nigeria. The hot season peaks around March–April, while most rainfall occurs between June and September during the wet season. Temperatures commonly range from the low-teens at night to the mid-30s (low-50s to mid-90s Fahrenheit) during the day, and rainfall variability influences agriculture and seasonal water availability in the district.

== Languages in Rafi ==
- Bassa
- Hausa
- Fulah
- Ura
- Pangu
- Kamuku
- Ngwe
- Kambari
- Gwari
