= Lopa language =

Kainji language spoken in Nigeria

Lopa
- Rerang
- Native to: Nigeria
- Region: Niger State
- Native speakers: (5,000 cited 1996)
- Language family: Niger–Congo?: Atlantic–Congo; Benue–Congo; Kainji; Kainji Lake; Oleran; Lopa
- Dialects: Tsupamini

Language codes
- ISO 639-3: lop
- Glottolog: lopa1238

Lopa/Rop
- Person: dɔ̀ɾóp
- People: òːɾɔ́p
- Language: òlːɔ́p (Ollop)

Rerang
- Person: dɔ̀ɾìɾã́ŋ
- People: òːɾìɾã́ŋ
- Language: òlːèɾã́ŋ (Oleran)

Lopa or Rop (Ollop) is a minor Kainji language of Nigeria.

Lopa people neighbouring the Busa language have shifted to that language.

The name Rerang (Oleran) subsumes both Lopa and the closely related Cuba language (Urcibar) that it surrounds.

Blench (2019) lists Tsupamini as a related variety or dialect.

== Name ==
The name Lopa likely comes from the name lópár (Lapar), which refers to both the Rop and the Shuba. Cover terms referring to both Urcibar and Ollop speakers are [dɔ̀ɾìɾáŋ̃ ] (one person), [òːɾìɾáŋ̃ ] (many people), and the language [òlːèɾáŋ̃].

== Location ==
Ollop is spoken in the major villages of àɾóp (Lopa town), ù̃jẽ ́mé (Gafara), rʷáːʃé (Raishe); and the minor villages of ʔʷéːɾà (Tungan Masu), ò̃sán (Bakin Ruwa), lópár (Lapar), áñ wá ̃ (Ana). Lopa speakers call themselves [dɔ̀ɾóp] (one person), [òːɾɔ́p] (many people), and the language [òlːɔ́p]. They refer to Urcibar speakers as [dɔ̀tʃíbár] (one person), [òːtʃíbár] (many people), and to their language as [ɘ̀ɹtʃíbár].
