= Alhaji Idris Alhassan Yusuf Tawari =

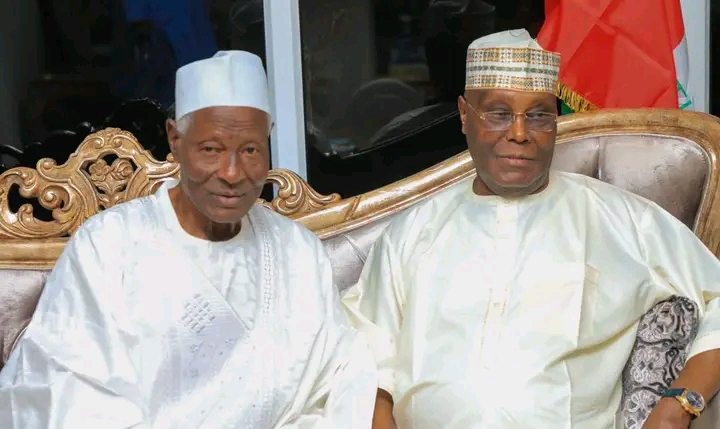
Agụma Tawari with His Excellency, Atiku Abubakar

Alhaji Idris Alhassan Yusuf Tawari is the Agụma (a title of the traditional ruler of the Bassa people) of Tawari Chiefdom, Koton Karfe Local Government Council of Kogi State, Nigeria.

He is a second class traditional ruler.
