= Kagara, Niger State =

Kagara
- Town
- Motto(s): Land of peace and tourism
- Location in Nigeria
- Coordinates: 10°11′04″N 6°15′12″E
- Country: Nigeria
- State: Niger State
- LGA: Rafi
- Time zone: UTC+1 (WAT)
- 3-digit postal code prefix: 922

Kagara is a community in Niger State, Nigeria, the headquarters of the Rafi Local Government Area. The Kagara Emirate is a traditional state with a first-class stool, currently held by Alhaji Ahmad Garba Gunna. Notably, the paramount chief of the emirate is a member of the Bassa people indicating that the Bassa have a significant traditional heritage in Kagara, the headquarters of Rafi Local Government Area in Nigeria.

Kagara is part of the Niger East Senatorial district, and is the seat of the Kagara Emirate. The other two major emirates in the state are the Minna Emirate and the Suleja Emirate, each of which expect political representation in the state if not at the national level. Early in 2010 the state government sacked the chairman of the local government area and set up a commission of inquiry to probe the council's financial undertakings during his term in office. In December 2010, a Minna High Court ordered his reinstatement.

The town has a talc processing plant. Construction of a dam was initiated in 1979 for a sum of N5 billion. The Federal University of Technology Minna carried out the Environmental Impact assessment for the Upper Niger River Basin and Rural Development Authority (UNRBDA). About N3 billion had been paid by February 2002, when the Minister of Water Resources, Muktar Shagari, gave the contractor a deadline to complete the dam by December that year. In February 2004 the Minister of State for Water Resources, Mr. Bashr Ishola Awotorebo visited the dam site, and as a result called the contractor to account for delays in the project. In August 2004, while presenting 500 hand pumps from the Federal Government to the Niger State Governor, Abdulkadir Kure, Mukhtar Shagari said the dam project could be doomed due to non-approval of the budgetary allocation. In August 2007, Bala Kuta of the All Nigeria Peoples Party, a National House of Assembly representative, pledged to help with the dam project.

One student is killed and 27 students, three teachers, twelve family members) were kidnapped by bandits on 17 February 2021.

Remains of the Iron Age Nok culture have been found at Kagara, which lies at the far northwest end of the zone of Nok culture.
