= Lela language =

Kainji language spoken in Nigeria

Lela
- Dakarkari
- C΄-Lélà
- Native to: Nigeria
- Region: Kebbi State, Niger State, Zamfara State
- Native speakers: (90,000 cited 1993)
- Language family: Niger–Congo?: Atlantic–Congo; Benue–Congo; Kainji; Northwest Kainji; Lela
- Dialects: Ribah

Language codes
- ISO 639-3: dri
- Glottolog: clel1238

Lela
- Person: K΄-Lélà
- People: Lélnà
- Language: C΄-Lélà

Lela or C'lela (also Cilela) is a Kainji language of Nigeria. It is known as Dakarkari in the Hausa language. Its speakers are known as the Lelna people.

== Location ==
The Lela live mostly in Kebbi State and Niger State. However, there are also some C-Lela speakers in other parts of Nigeria, including in Gummi LGA of Zamfara State.
