= Tegina =

- Town
- Location within Nigeria
- Coordinates: 10.0706°N 6.1906°E
- Country: Nigeria
- State: Niger State
- LGA: Rafi
- Elevation: 270 m (890 ft)

Population (2016)
  - Total: 24,037
- Time zone: UTC+1 (WAT)

Tegina is a town in Rafi LGA, Niger State, Nigeria. Various Kainji languages are spoken in and around Tegina.

In 2021 a mass kidnapping of children by gunmen occurred at the end of May, at least 150 students went missing.

== Villages ==
Villages in Tegina:

Agwai, Ankawa, B. Gona, Bangu, Biito, D. Padama, Dada, G. Abashi, G. Angu, G. Barau, G. Danbiki, G. Dangama, G. Dangoru, G. Danjuma, G. Dijimakert, G. Jada, G. Katina, G. Kushama, G. Maiganga, G. Maikangara, G. Manzo, G. Tanko, G. Wakayi, G. Wani, G. Zubdomgi, Gende, Gini, Gisisi, Godora, Gulangi, Gunugu, Halatayi, Indaki, Inga, Inga Gari, Jambaka, Jiro, K. Madaka, Kagara, Kakuri, Katako, Kuru, Kwana, Luaga, Machinanugu, Madagwa, Mahanga, Natsina, Rubo, Rubu, Sabon Gari, Samboro, Sufawa, T. Ceshi, T. Duste, Tegina, Tunma, U. Alhaji, U. Uban-Dawaki, U. Butsi, Ugu, Ussa, Wayan, Yalwa

== See also ==
- Rafi, Nigeria
- Zungeru
