= Laru language =

Kainji language spoken in Nigeria

Laru
- Shen
- Native to: Nigeria
- Region: Niger State
- Native speakers: (5,000 cited 1995)
- Language family: Niger–Congo?: Atlantic–Congo; Benue–Congo; Kainji; Kainji Lake; Laru

Language codes
- ISO 639-3: lan
- Glottolog: laru1238
- ELP: Shen

Laru
- Person: Shen
- Language: Shen gwe

Laru (Laro), or Shen (Sengwe), is a minor Kainji language of Nigeria. Speakers are shifting to Busa.

== Dialects ==
There are three dialects of Shen spoken in the following villages:

- Kárábàndéi and Sànsání
- Sàːgúnú4, Sʷàʃí, Lúmːà, and Barkatai
- Mɔ̀nːáĩ, Sáŋkʷà, and Màláːlé

The major villages, ordered from largest to smallest, are Sàːgúnú, Kárábàndéi, Sʷàʃí, Lúmːà, and Mɔ̀nːáĩ. There are fewer than 4,000 speakers.

Ethnologue (22nd ed.) lists Laru villages as Karabonde, Leshigbe, Luma, Monnai, Sansanni, and Shagunu.
