= Kambari languages =

Kainji languages of northwestern Nigeria

Kambari
- Native to: Nigeria
- Region: Kebbi State, Niger State
- Ethnicity: Kambari
- Language family: Niger–Congo?: Atlantic–Congo; Benue–Congo; Kainji; Kambari

Language codes
- ISO 639-3: –
- Glottolog: kamb1317

The Kambari or Kamberi languages are a cluster of Kainji languages spoken in northwestern Nigeria (Kebbi State and Niger State).

== Geographic distribution ==
The Kambarri languages are spoken in Kebbi and Niger States, Nigeria. There are also some speakers in other parts of Nigeria, including Zamfara State and Abuja.

== Languages ==
The Kambari languages are:

- Kambari
  - Kambari I:
    - Gadi
    - Vadi
    - Cishingini
    - Tsishingini
    - Baangi
    - Yumu
  - Kambari II:
    - Tsikimba
    - Gaushi
    - Wenci
