= Southern Kaduna =

Southern Kaduna Gurara/Nok Southern Zaria
- Cultural region
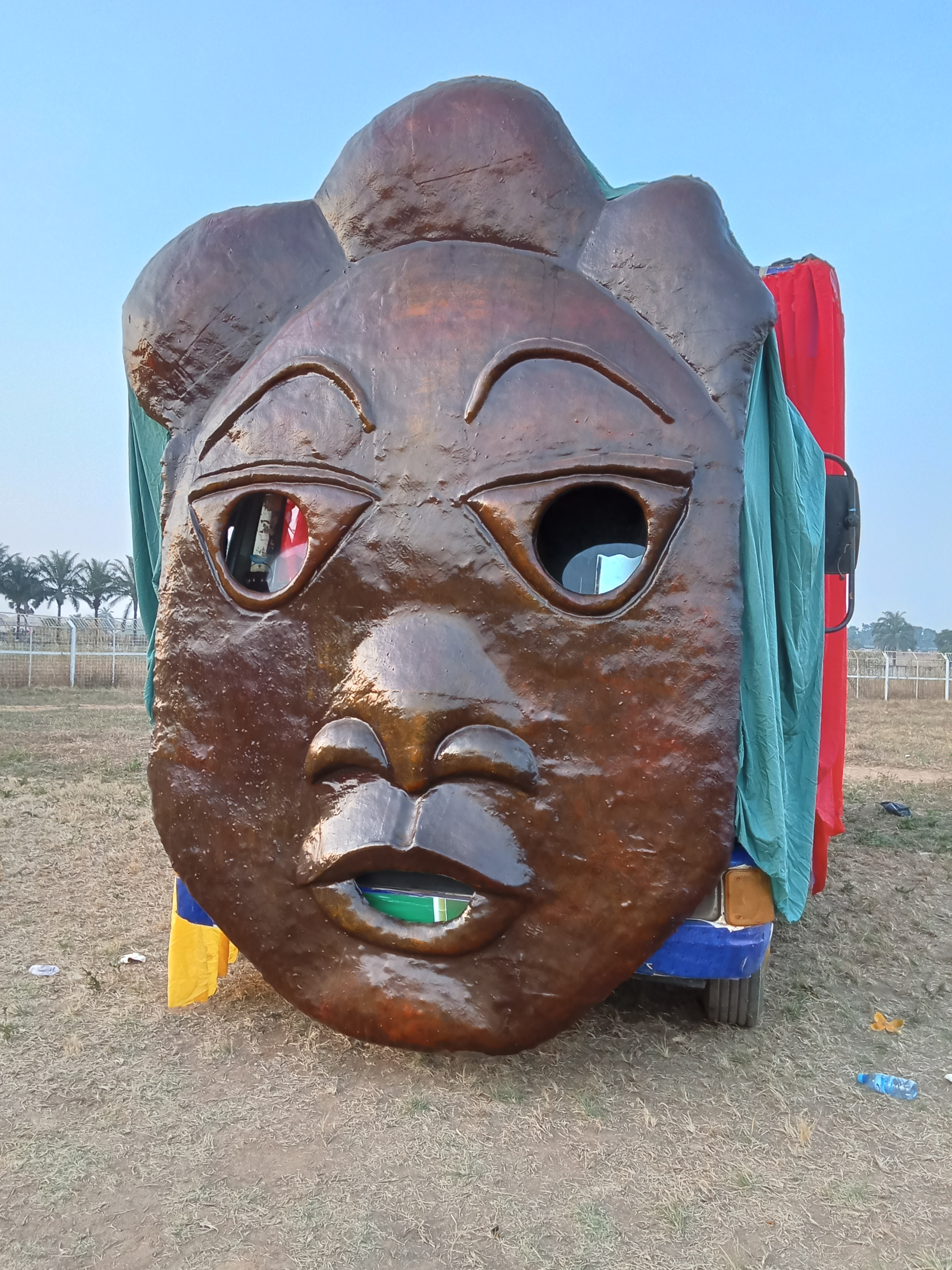
- Nok plastic head on a truck during the SK Fest 2023, Township Stadium, Kafanchan
- Nicknames: Chongai, SK
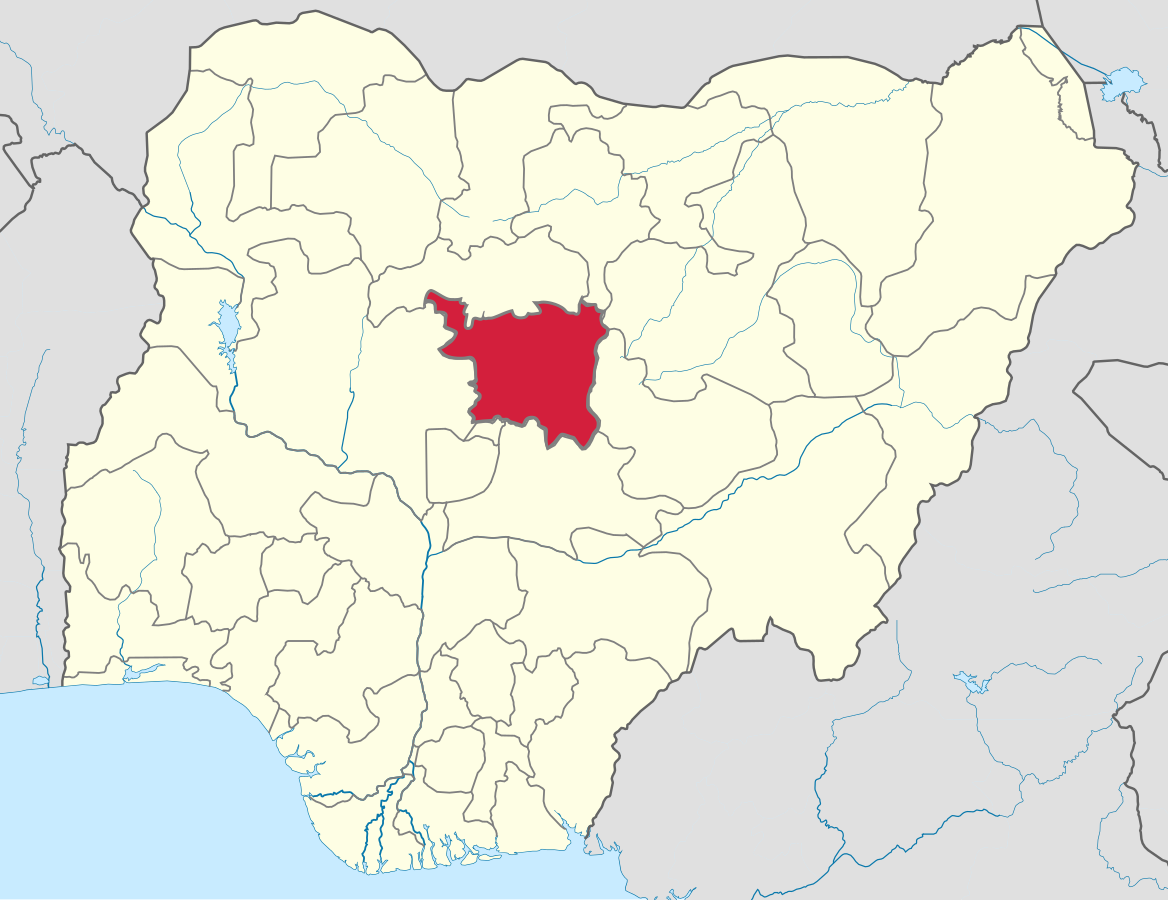
- Location of Southern Kaduna in Nigeria
- Coordinates: 09°34′53″N 8°17′00″E
- Part of: Kaduna State Nigeria
- Settlement of Nok culture: c. 1500 BC
- Nok culture area: c. 1500 BC - c. AD 500
- Kwararafa confederacy; and Nupe Kingdom: c. 1000 - c. 1820 and c. 1531 - 1897
- Northern Nigeria Protectorate: 1900 - 1914
- Northern Region British Nigeria; (later unofficial Middle Belt, Nigeria): 1914 - 1960 (1950s)
- Nerzit region: c. 1950
- Southern Kaduna: c. 1990
- Gurara/Nok State: proposed
- Founder: Proto Nok people
- Capital: • Kafanchan (Economic capital)
- Composed of: List: Chikun; Jaba; Jema'a; Kachia; Kaduna South; Kagarko; Kajuru; Kaura; Kauru; Lere; Sanga; Zangon Kataf

Government
  - Type: • Chief: Agwam; Agwom (Agom); B'gwam; Ere; Esu (Sa); Etum; Kpop; Ngbiar; Odyong; Pukgom; Res; Tum; Uchu; • Clan heads • Village heads

Area
  - Land: 26,000 km^{2} (10,000 sq mi)

Population (2016 estimate)
  - Total: 4,564,100

Demographics
  - Major indigenous languages: Adara-Kulu; Atsam-Bishi-Timap; Gbagyi-Gbari; Hyam-Gyong; Ninzam-Nikyob-Nindem; Tinɔr; Tugbiri-Niragu-T'kurmi-Tivori; Tyap-Jju
  - Major non-indigenous languages: English; Fulfulde; Hausa; Igbo; Nigerian Pidgin; Yoruba
- Time zone: WAT

Southern Kaduna (Tyap: A̱tak Ka̱duna [ǝtag kǝduna]; Jju: Ka̱tak A̱ka̱duna [kǝtag ǝkǝduna]; Hausa: Kudancin Kaduna [kudǝnt͡ʃin kəduna]; formerly Southern Zaria) is an area of the Nok Culture region inhabited by various related ethnic groups who do not identify as Hausa, living south of Zaria, Kaduna State. It is located in the Middle Belt region of Nigeria. According to the Southern Kaduna People's Union (SOKAPU), Southern Kaduna consists of 12 (or 13) Local Government Areas out of 23 in Kaduna State.

In September 2020, the SOKAPU national publicity secretary, Luka Binniyat, in a statement he signed said the region makes up 51.2% of the entire state's population as shown in the 2006 census figures, occupying 26,000 sq. km. of the state's 46,000 sq. km. total land mass, with 57 registered ethnic nationalities of the state's 67 identified ones. Angerbrandt (2015) views it as being less of a geographical identity and more of an ethnic identity concept.

== History ==
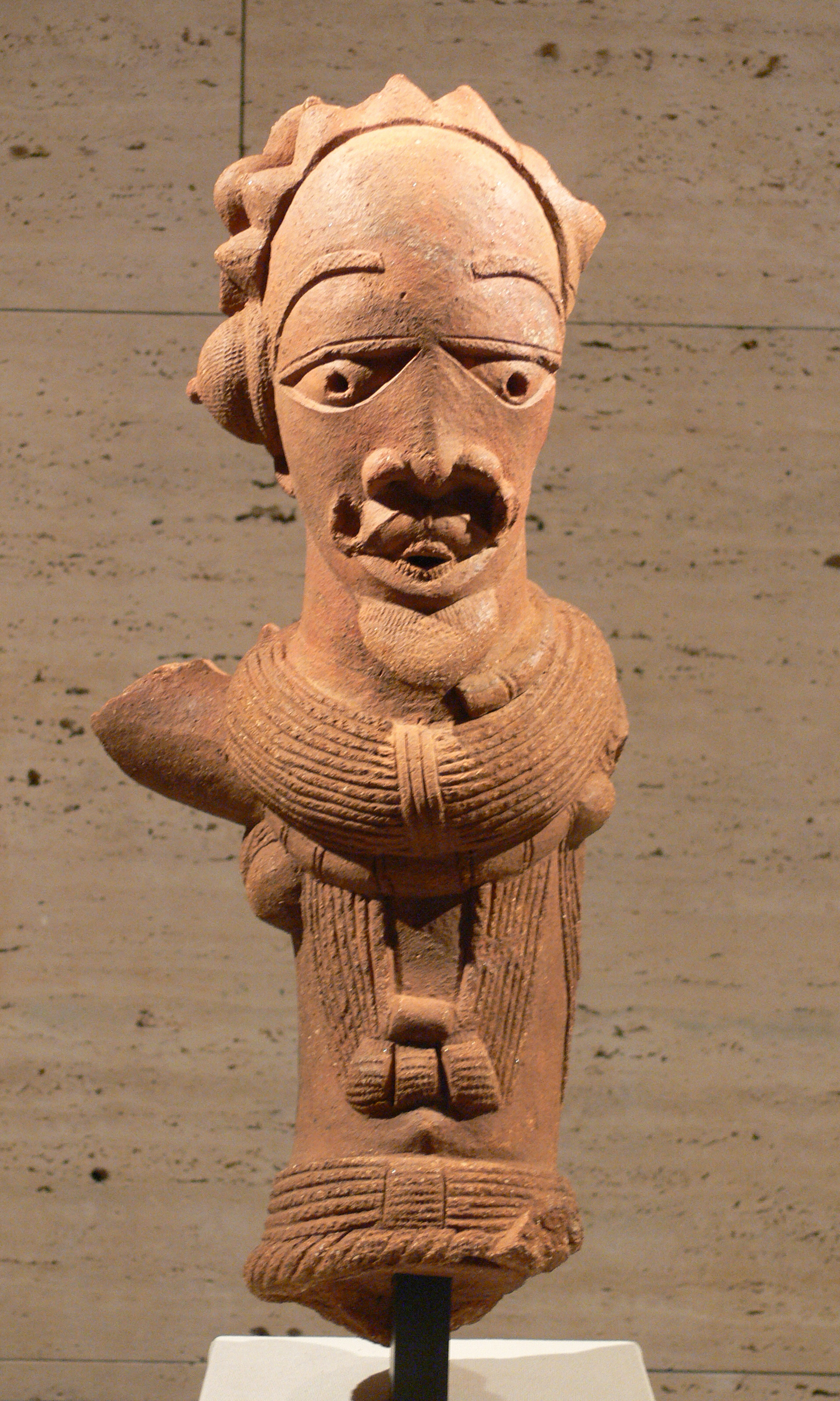
Nok male figure; dated 195 B.C.–A.D. 205; terracotta; 49.5 cm × 22.2 cm × 16.8 cm (19.5 in × 8.7 in × 6.6 in); at Kimbell Art Museum (Fort Worth, Texas, USA)

=== Antiquity ===
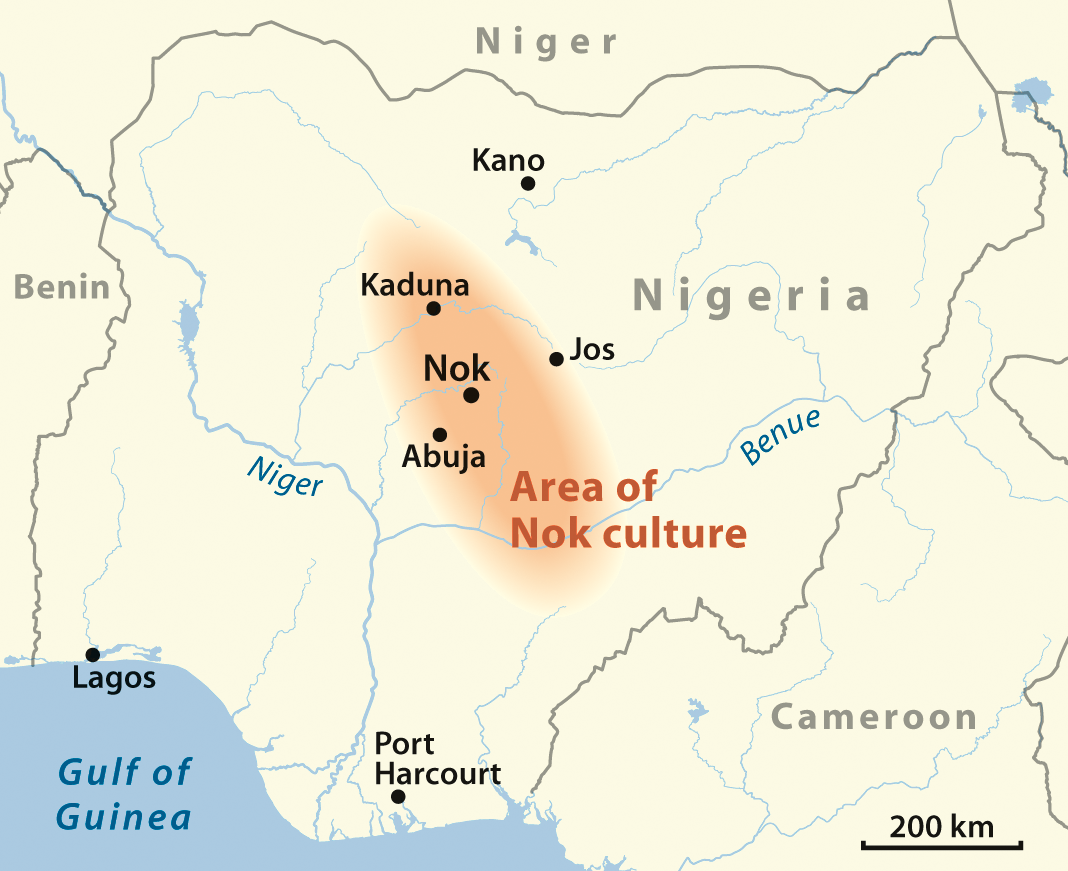
Nok culture area

==== Nok Culture ====
The Nok culture thrived in the area now known as Southern Kaduna as early as 1500 BC and lasted up until circa AD 500. This was an Iron Age civilization known to be the first to produce life-form terracotta sculptures in West Africa or possible the entire Sub-Saharan Africa. This civilization came to be known when in the spring of 1944, Bernard Fagg, a British government anthropologist, documented the discovery of a Nok figurine in the Jama'a area of the Southern Zaria division and directed excavations across the central area of Nigeria to discover more and the construction of museums to house them across Nigeria.

Breunig and Rupp (2016) presented a hypothesis stating that the Nok culture region was colonized by people with unknown origins migrating during that period. They added that since the crops used by them, especially millet were originally from the Sahel region, it is possible they migrated from the north. They said the earlier settlers may have preferred to settle in the mountains due to the radiocarbon dates being older around such areas, and at the start, they were farmers of the pearl millet (Pennisetum glaucum).

=== Middle Ages ===
==== Post-Nok ====
By circa AD 300, the population of Nok began to depreciate for no known reason. Later specimens excavated from Chado, around Godogodo, submitted by J.F. Jemkur were indicated to have been made around the 6th century AD. Hence, the founders of the Nok civilization existed up until this time.

It is thought that Niger-Congo-speaking groups like the Yoruba, Jukun, C'Lela, among others could be offsprings of the ancient Nok peoples. It is also thought the Yoruba Ife Empire and the Edo kingdom of Benin could have inherited their art of making bronze figurines from the Nok culture due to the similarities in style with the Nok terracotta even though these latter civilizations are about 1,000 years apart from Nok. Art historians also opine that Igala, Nupe, Yoruba and Igbo, medieval sculpture tradition seem to have descended from the Nok tradition of plastic art. It was also noted that the Mande, Akan, Hausa, Yoruba and Igbo who existed between latitudes 11 degrees and 16 degrees North were the most active developing societies of West Africa in the early Iron Age period (c. 500 BC to AD 1000).

==== Kwararafa Confederacy ====
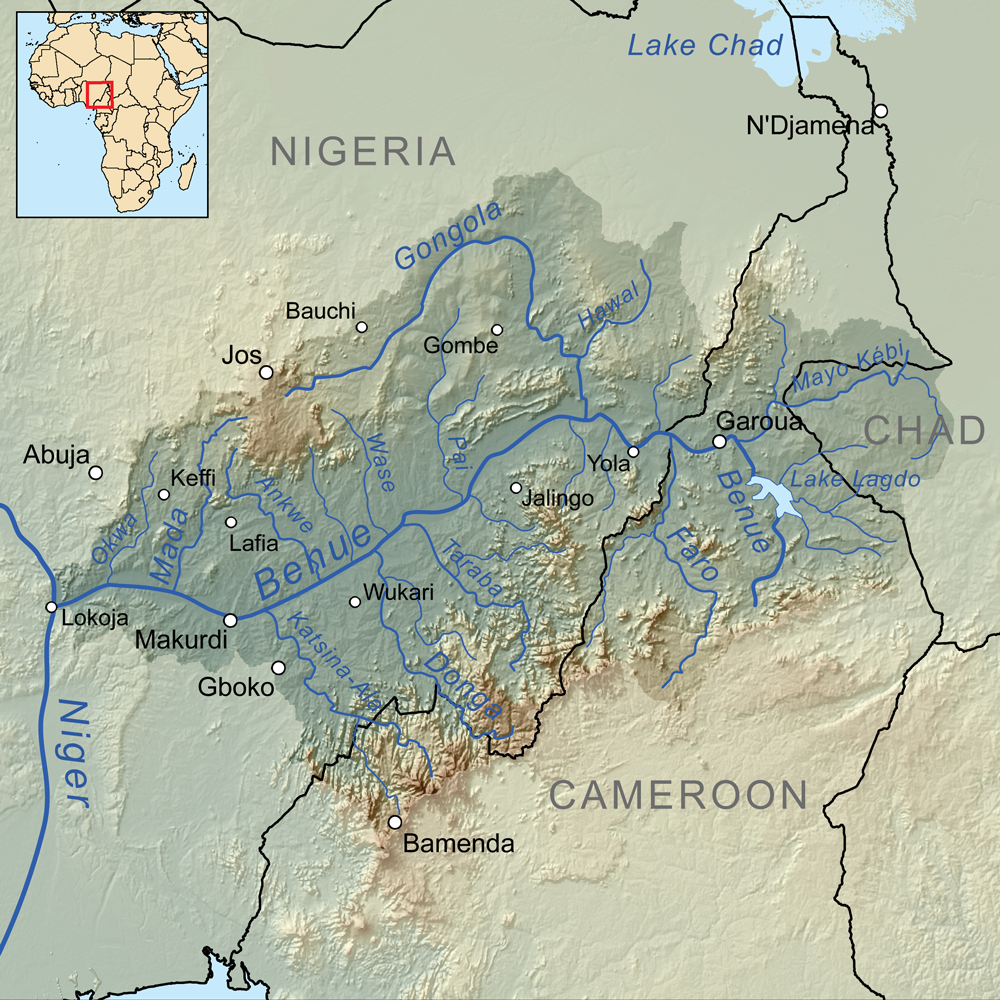
Map showing the rivers Gongola, Hawal, and other tributary rivers of the Benue

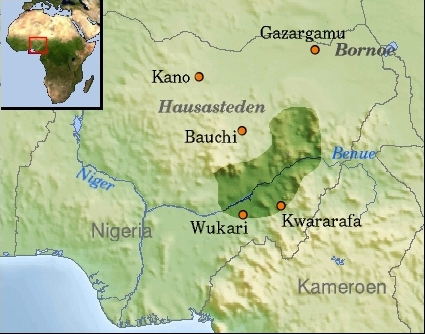
Kwararafa within the Benue Basin

According to J.B. Webster (1976, 1993), the Kwararafa confederacy was said to have undergone four phases in its history. The first phase started at Santolo, on the Hadejia River's southern banks at about AD 1000. An account from Katsina recalled Kwararafa waging a war with Korau, its king, in 1260. Kwararafa's capital was later moved north of the confluence of the Gongola-Hawal rivers precisely at Tagara, about the year 1380. Kwararafa was said to have been forced to pay 200 slaves to Kano under King Yaji (r. 1349 - 1385) and Kanageji (r. 1390 - 1410). Likewise, Queen Amina of Zazzau was said to have conquered all the towns [south of Kano] as far as Nupe and Kworarafa and both kings paid tributes to her with Nupe giving 40 eunuchs and 10,000 kolas annually for 34 years. The Kano Chronicle, testified by its English translator, H.R. Palmer, to be 'roughly accurate' in comparison with the Bornu Chronicles translated by Dr. Barth, presented her as a ruler who reigned at the same period Dauda Bakon Damisa (1421 - 1438) reigned in Kano as Sarki. Kwararafa's defeat by the Bornu Empire (c. 1462 - 1495) will render her inactive for many years, with her capital moved to Byepi (Apa), south of the Benue River.

Intensified wars would make Kwararafa a refuge for those fleeing Islam in the north. With the ascension of King Kinjo in 1610, Kwararafa’s population and abundance increased. Her prosperity in the Trans-Saharan and Trans-Atlantic trades would help her become more vigorous. She traded in salt—found in abundance in the Benue Valley, slaves, and other rare commodities in exchange for horses and European goods. For these trades across the Atlantic, Calabar became known as the Port of Kwararafa where her goods including slaves were shipped. Between 1610 and 1790, she remained independent and waged wars with the Hausa city-states and the Kanuri state in the north. Zazzau fell to Kwararafa within this period. Between 1582 and 1703, Kano suffered repeated attacks from Kwararafa.

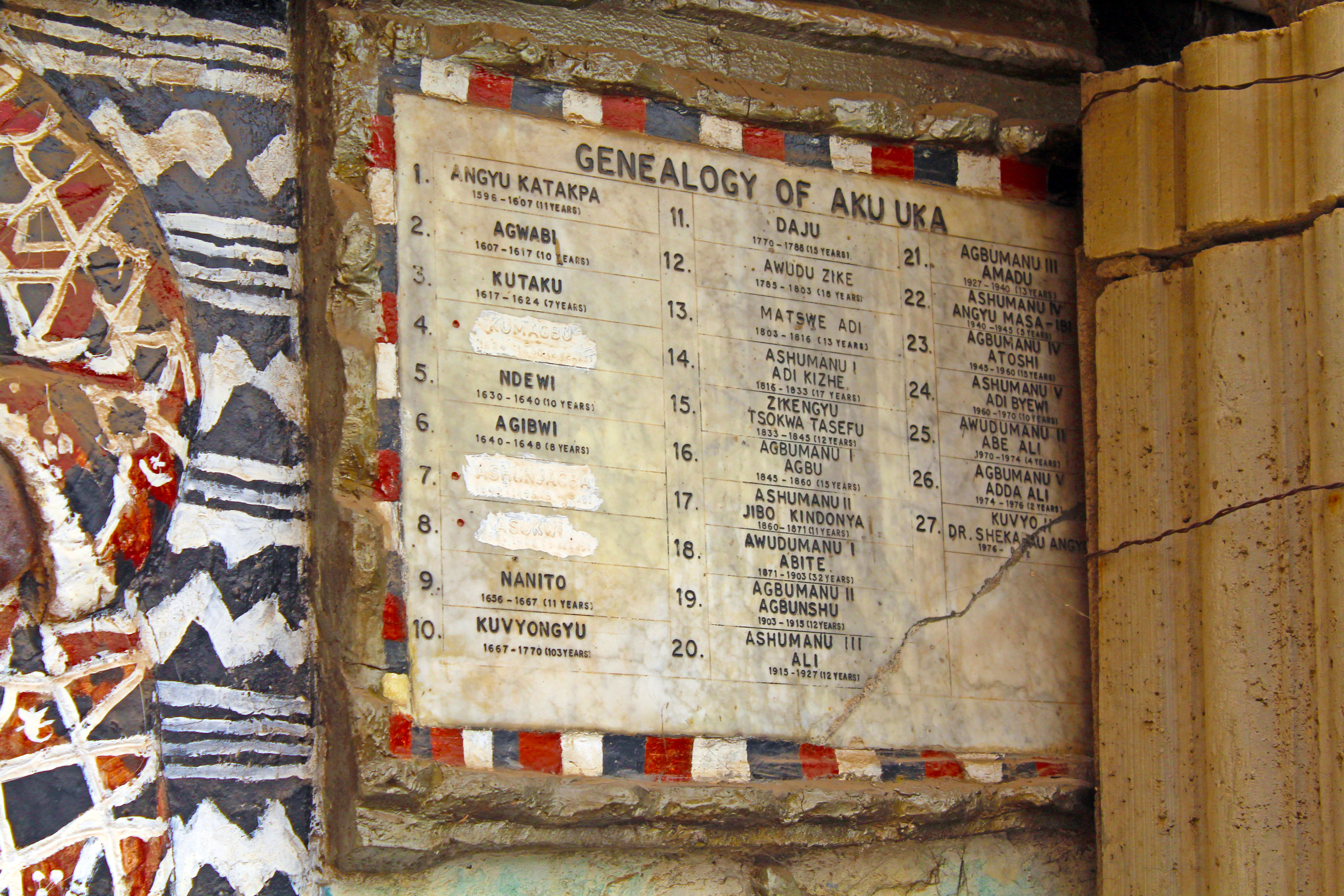
Genealogy of the Aku Ukas of Wukari (also Uka/Ukari)

Kwararafa was most powerful around 1680. She launched attacks across Hausaland and when her armies got to the Borno Empire, the king was killed and the capital, Ngazargamu, was destroyed. The Jukun dynasty came to power about this time and became Kwararafa’s major ethnic group. Internal strife, attacks from invading groups (like the Samba and Tiv), and possibly drought, weakened Kwararafa’s strength. Her last king, Adi Matswen (r. 1780 - 1810), was said to have fled the capital, Uka, to create a new capital at Wase. By 1820, the new Jukun dynasty was established in Wukari. This became a more religious and less warlike state.

Abah and Okoye-Ugwu (2002) posited that Kwararafa was inhabited by several ethnic groups and due to the mass exit of people in its northern portions, a new capital was established at Apa (Byepi) where power struggles occurred between the Jukun, Idoma and Abakwariga (non-muslim Hausa). The capital was then moved to Kororofa, then to Puje, and then to Wukari (Uka). They further argued from the point of view of the ‘’Idoma-Alekwu oral epic’’, that the term Apa may not only refer to the Jukun but to the groups which trace their origins to Apa like the Idoma, Alago, Igbira, and Igala. They went further to cite the possibility of the Jukun being a later migrant into the confederacy from the Ogoja and Calabar axis. They replaced the Abakwariga in power to become a majority only later on. It was cited, too, that Idu, the perceived Idoma patriarch was said to be king of Apa at the period of Jukun entry, which forced Idoma’s later southwestern migration. The Jukun, however, have another story to their migration. According to C.K. Meek, however, the Jukun were said to have migrated from the east, possibly Yemen, alongside the Kanuri and Yoruba peoples. By 1250 AD, the Jukun Kwona had settled in the Gongola River basin according to H.R. Palmer.

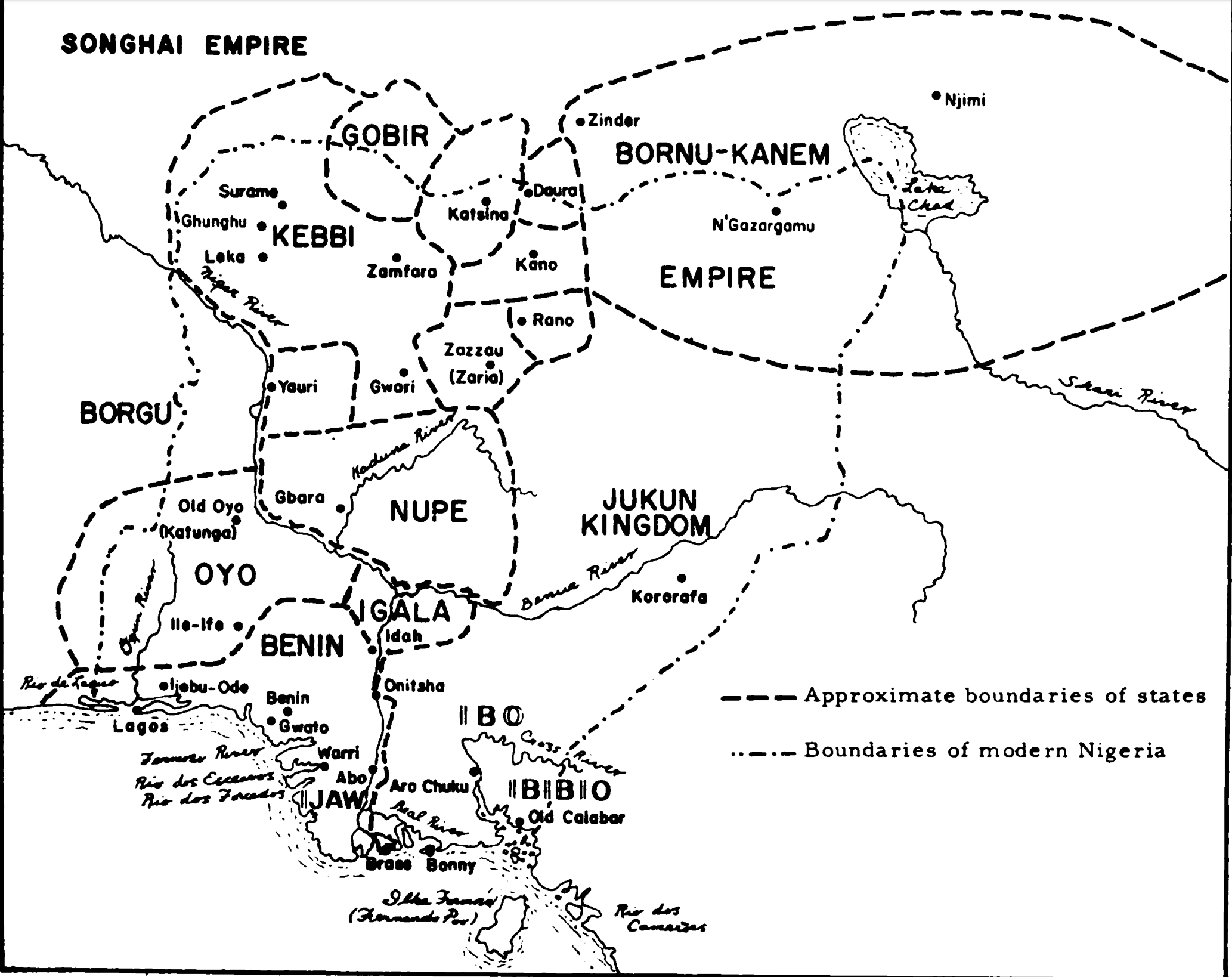
Kwararafa c. 16th century

The 16th century was said to be characterized by many migrations by the progenitors of the ethnic groups that occupy the central region of Nigeria today. Smaller groups also moved out of it. These factors were said to have contributed to the disintegration of the Kwararafa multiethnic confederacy towards the end of the 17th and early 18th centuries.

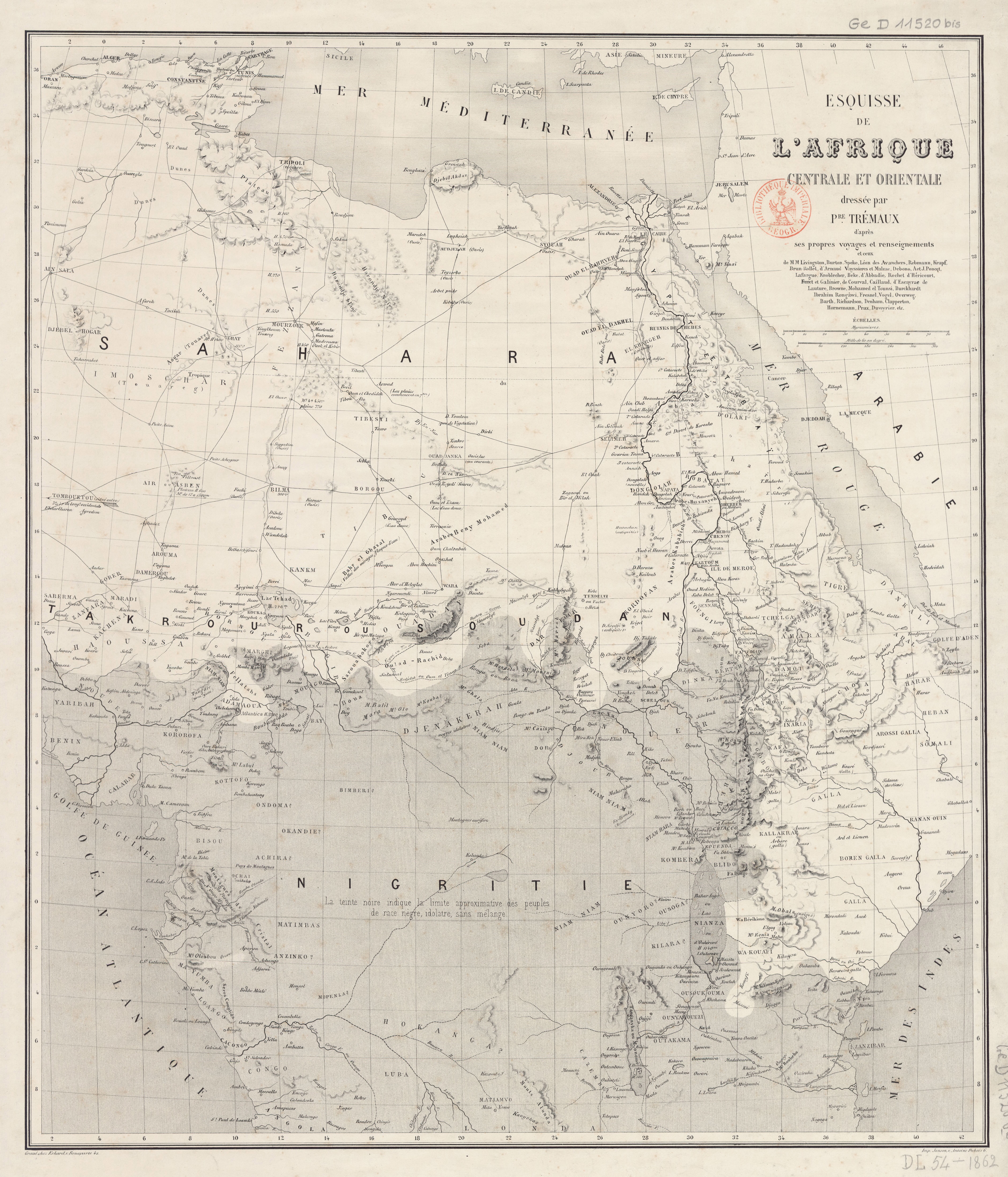
An 1862 French map of Central and Easter Africa showing Kwararafa (Kororofa), Calabar, Nupe (Noupe), and others

A version of many ethnic groups' place of origin in today's Southern Kaduna point to the Jos-Bauchi Plateau. A narrative of the migration of the Ham people stated that the Ham broke away from related groups on the plateau and began journeying westwards until they got to a place called Shike Ham (or the Ham forest) around the Gurara River. The word Ham was translated as "break-away" in the Hyam language, which coincidentally has a similar meaning as the word Tyap which means "to cut-off" in the Tyap language. However, there also exist clans among these groups that claim to come from no where but where they presently are. Among the Atyap, while the Agbaat and Aminyam clans claim origins from waves of migration, the Aku and Ashokwa clans have lost memories of where they came from.

==== Caravan trade, Fulani Jihad, and slave-raids ====
Around the Jos Plateau in the northwestern flank of Kwararafa, Achi (2005:378) mentioned that the itinerary settlement of Zangon Katab (or Katab) was established circa AD 1650 for the itinerant Hausa and Borno traders by the Atyap people, and became important in the region. This settlement was said to have been consolidated by c. 1750. The earliest Muslim settlement in Zangon Katab was called Angwan Tudu build around a place known as the Mabatado (or Mabarado, derogatorily Barawa Dawa by the Hausa) which served as the meeting place of the Atyap elders and center of Atyap festivities, occupied by Mele and his countrymen from Borno who were into long-distance or caravan trade and Islamic teaching. The land was granted to the settlers by the Atyap with certain terms attached. Hausa settlers from Kauru soon came and settled at Dorgozo. They, too, were traders. The settlers had a market chief who collected tributes from the traders to compensate the Atyap landlords. Later in the late 19th century, a Fulani ward was created in the Zangon Katab market due to the raids of Ningi in the Atyap area. Baba argued that the alliance between the Fulani of Zangon Katab, the Muslim groups of Kauru, and Zazzau (or Zaria) against the Atyap had only resulted to the Atyap's hostility against their settlers, and should not be mistaken for control of the Atyap by the former, as the British made it seem.

After the attacks on those against the jihadist views in Kano, Zaria, and Yakoba (now Bauchi), some Hausas migrated to Zangon Katab. Jihadist flags bearers also tagged along to fight and gain wealth. They waged wars of expansion on surrounding settlements. By 1820, the Amala, Arumaruma and others around Kauru, Lere and Kajuru on the western foot of the Jos Plateau became as vassals of Zaria. It was from their settlements that attacks were launched by the Zazzau Emirate against the Atyap (Katab) and their neighbours. In the 1830s, Hausa traders in Zangon Katab began to ally more with Zazzau and demanded complete control of the trade routes from Atyap. Zazzau soon imposed a dhimmi status on the Atyap in the 1840s wherein the Atyap will pay Zazzau jizya tributes including 15 slaves, 20 raffia mats, tins of honey and raffia frond bundles per clan, to avoid attack from the jihadist state. The Atyap refused to oblige since they saw themselves as an independent entity. They began to attack the jekada who were messengers from Zazzau out to collect those items. While some may get killed, others, including Hausa traders and herders got captured and sold to the Irigwe middlemen on the Jos Plateau who sold them off as slaves. Mamman Sani (r. 1846—1860) of Zazzau on assumption of power began to wage wars on those who resist the emirate’s control. The Aniragu, Atumi, Kono, Anu, Avono, Agbiri, Avori, and Rishuwa-Kuzamani in the Kauru axis got attacked first for refusing to partner with Kauru, a vassal of Zazzau. At Dibyyi in 1847, Sani launched an offensive attack on the Bajju to clear the caravan trade routes. The Bajju then launched a defensive by making hostages of Hausa and Fulani people in their territory, and forced Jama’a and Zazzau pay tribute to them for some years.

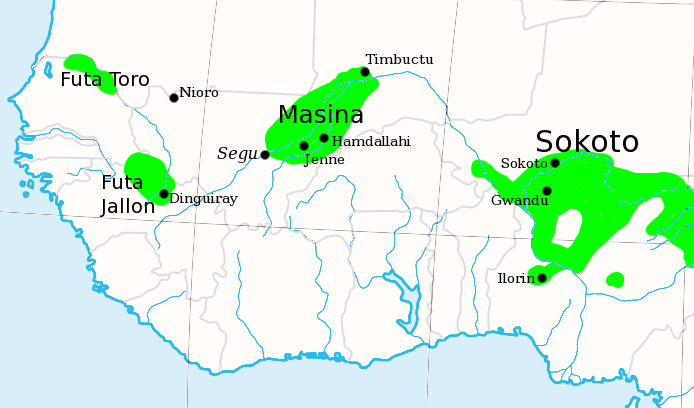
Areas taken by the Fulani jihadists c. 1830

European travellers in the 19th century like Heinrich Barth in his “Travels and Discoveries in North and Central Africa” appendix, narrated the story of his co-traveller, Eduard Vogel, who visited Yakoba (now Bauchi) from Kano and Katab in 1855. He had reached Kano earlier in 1851. According to Barth, the Katab route passes through the western flank of the Jos Plateau where most of the people of the region live. He noted that the people of Mbutu village paid no tributes either to the Fulani of Zaria (or Zazzau) or Yakoba, and constantly cut off communication [in the itinerary trading route].

From Yakoba, he travelled to Adamawa and Zaria—passing through the hilly eastern portions of the Plateau, and came up with a general conclusion about the entire southern region of Bauchi thus:

Also I have come to know the cannibal races with whom the Muhammedan inhabitants have very little to do. The name Njem-njem is a collective term similar in meaning to "maneater" . . . universally applied to all the heathens between Jakoba (Yakoba) and the Benue, for whom "flesh" is important.

About the slave-raiding practices of the emirates against the people of the Plateau, he noted:

The country between Bautshi (Bauchi) and Salia (Zaria) is entirely inhabited by heathens, mostly without any dress, ornamenting themselves with a bit of rice straw in the upper lip. The Sultan had the following system of catching slaves. He occupied with an imposing force the fields in the valley, driving all his horses in the then green harvest until the poor devils on the mountains surrendered for fear of starvation and sent down the number of boys requested by him, so he got in three weeks 200 fine slaves, which were marched off immediately to Sokoto for sale.

In an interview with an elderly woman in a Ham village, Gadzama (2014) narrated that the piercing of the lips of daughters back then by families was to remember family members that were taken by the raiders who come from the far north and south and to give the raiders the impression that their target belonged to someone else. Those with pierced upper lips had lesser market value in the slave market, and would not be purchased by major slavers who viewed them as already-used. Hence, parents used this as an advantage to protect their daughters from being captured. Years after the complete stoppage of Fulani slave-raiding activities by the British empire, upper lip-piercing will go on to become a fashionable practice for some time.

In 1862, Karl Moritz von Beurmann visited this region and could not proceed to Hammarua and Yola (Adamawa) due to what was noted as 'rebellions in the southern part of the emirate'.

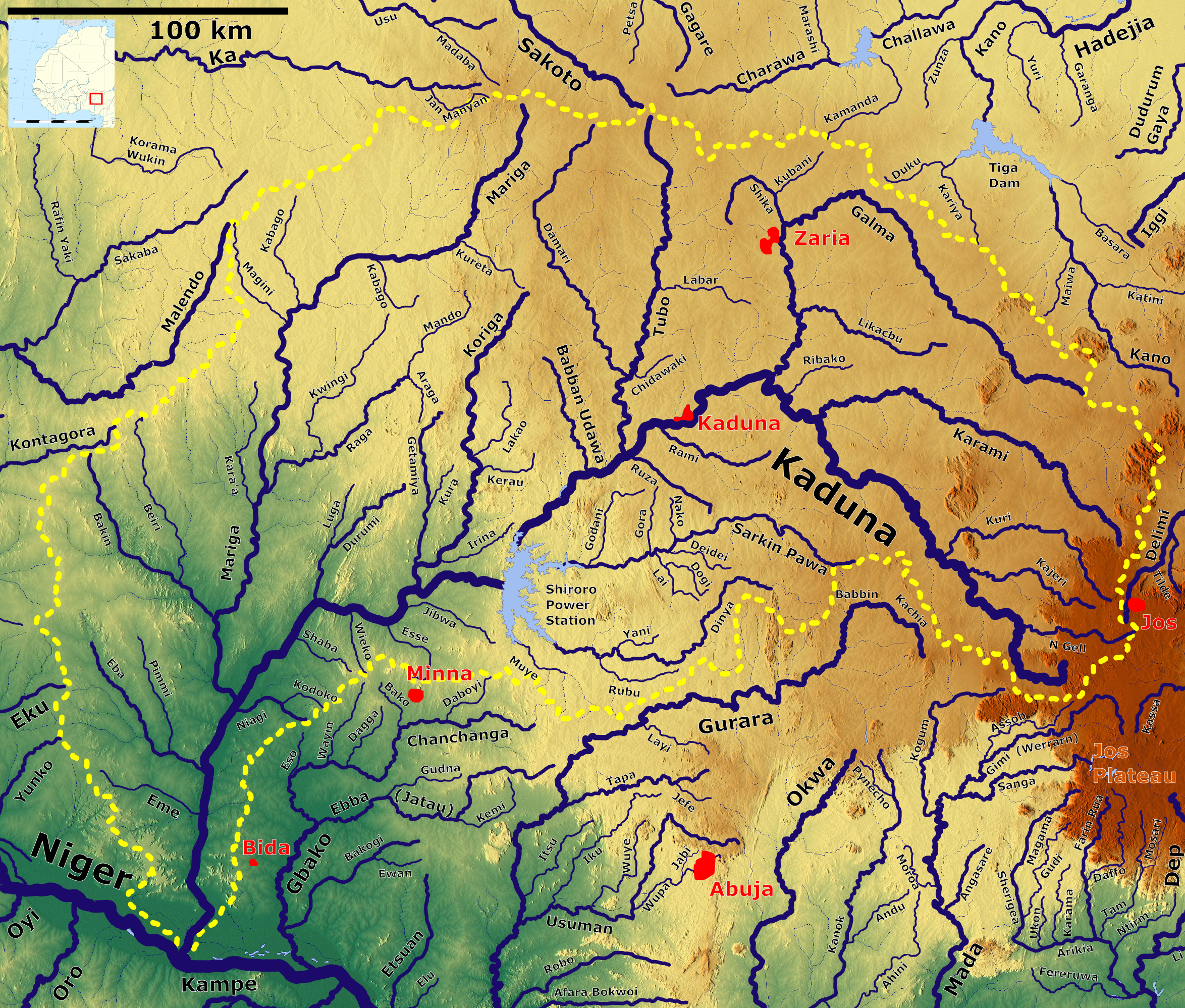
The Kaduna River system

In his "Notes of a Journey from Bida in Nupe, to Kano in Haussa, Performed in 1862" (1867:96), Dr. W.B. Baikie described the region as "a country devastated by war". He noted that on 15 June 1862, amidst confusion, the king (Sarkin Zazzau) with about 3,000 horses, men, women, and beasts of burden on a wet ground, moved his camp to the Kaduna and at long last, made camp between 14° and 16° west near the river. He then described the town of Zangon Katab (to the northeast) which he passed through on 18 June 1862, as

"a rocky defile with granite blocks of granite placed one on another, like a Cyclopean wall, surrounded by huge boulders".

He labelled the town as "Kuttub” in his map (1867:unnumbered, diagram 2).

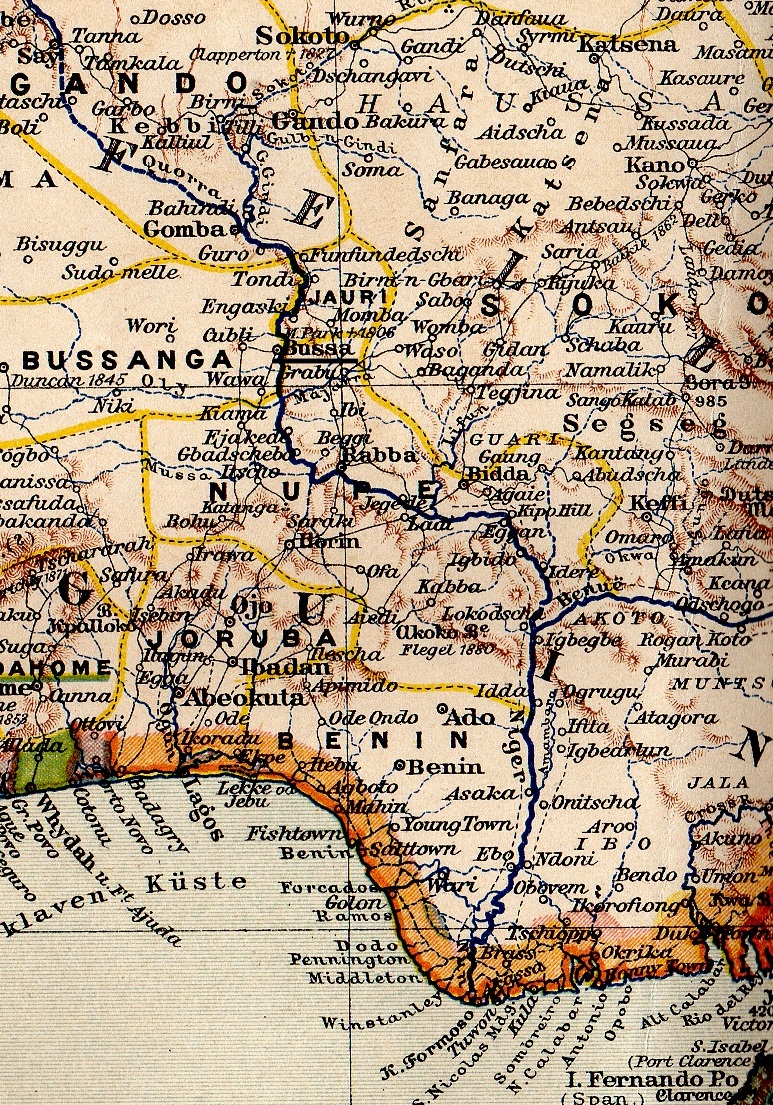
An 1889 German map with Zangon Katab labelled Sango Katab

In 1866, Gerhard Rohlfs noted something similar while passing through Bauchi, claiming that there was a complete halt in the trade between Adamawa and Nupe. He then proceeded through the Katab western route. Rohlfs warned in his notes saying,

...don't venture too far from the city…oh wanderer, or you may find an arrow in your breast. For the armed heathens do not distinguish the Christian from the Muslim, they know only the latter, who steal their children and women and carry them into slavery. And when they so revenge themselves, who can blame them? Without support, without military leadership, without guns, they are too weak to fight an open war.

Due to continuous attacks from the west on Zazzau from the Mai-Sudan of Kontagora, Umaru Nagwamatse (r. 1859–1876) who raided the region south of Zazzau, especially areas like Kagarko, Kachia, Kajuru and Chikun while attempting to get to Zazzau, the Sarkin Zazzau, Abdullahi in 1871 picked a Bekulu Muslim convert, Tatumare, and titled him Kuyambana and his role was to forcefully collect tributes from his Bekulu people and the Anghan people. A second person, Yawa, was picked in the 1880s by the emir, Sambo of Zazzau (r. 1881—1889), and titled, Sarkin Yamma (chief of the West) to patrol against Ibrahim Nagwamatse of Kontagora from the western flanks of Zazzau. From Chikun, Fatika, Kachia, Kagarko and Kajuru, Yawa raided the Gbagyi, Koro, Adara, Atyap, Bekulu and the Anghan. Tatumare and Yawa became Zazzau’s first agents in the Zangon Katab area. At Kudaru and Kachia, Zazzau stationed fighters to respond to invasions from Ningi and Abuja (now Suleja), respectively.

It was noted by European travellers that the retreat to the mountains as refugees, their hostility towards the Muslim emirates, and the so-called archaic customs of the peoples of this region were a direct result of the slave-raiding policies of the Fulani-led emirates.

=== British Imperialism ===
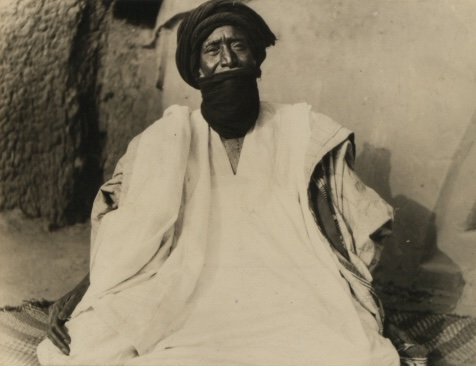
Ibrahim Nagwamatse c. 1903–1929

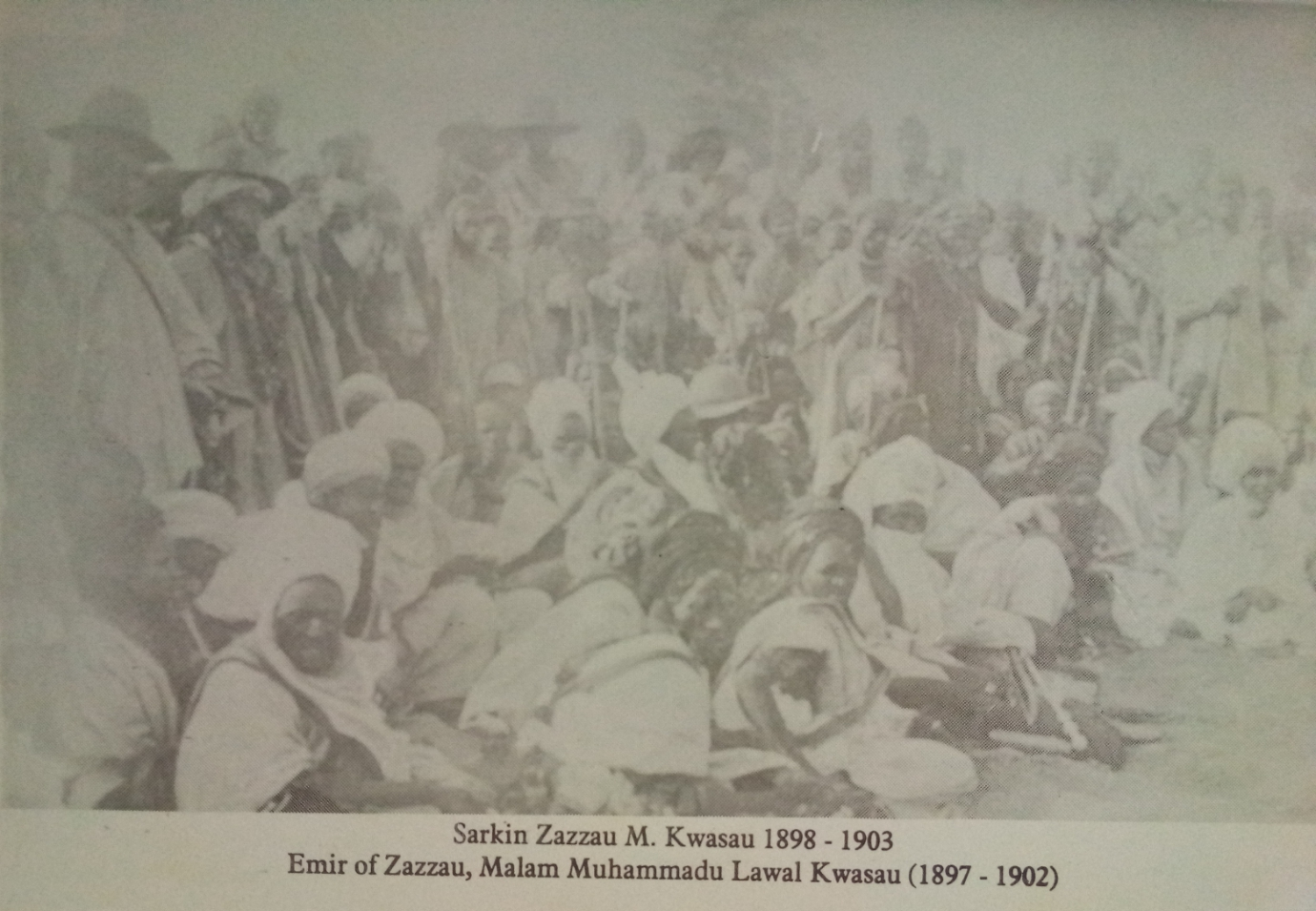
Kwassau and his royal entourage

==== Northern Nigeria Protectorate (1900–1914) ====
After the proclamation of a British Protectorate of Northern Nigeria on January 1, 1900, the peoples of the Hausa city-states and Nupe (now under Fulani caliphate control), the old Borno empire, and old Kwararafa were lumped into this new colonial entity with Brigadier-General Sir Frederick D. Lugard as it first High Commissioner. Colonel Kemball led troops of the West African Frontier Force (WAFF) into what was to be known as the Southern Zaria territory in early 1900. Two WAFF columns were also sent to Zaria in February 1900. Ibrahim Nagwamatse of Kontagora (r. 1880–1901 and 1903–1929) invaded Zaria in 1901, with a strength of about 20,000 fighting men. They camped on the outskirts of Zaria at Maska. Nagwamatse was a slave raider like other Fulani rulers. The British responded to that by establishing a military garrison in Zaria, by request from Muhammadu Lawal Kwassau of Zazzau (r. 1897–1902). This also halted Kwassau’s slave raiding of the peoples south of his emirate.

Zaria Province was created in March 1902. Captain Abadie was made the first Resident. In the middle of that year, Kwassau grew impatient with the British and launched his last brutal attack on the Atyap, a campaign which he had begun in 1897. According to British sources, only over 1,000 Atyap people were killed in Kwassau’s attacks, but Atyap scholars think the figures were higher. At about this time, there were southward migrations of the Atyap people due to Kwassau’s wars known as Tyong Kwasa̱u (escape from Kwassau) in Tyap. The Atyap also lost Marok Gandu of Magata, their key fighter who was impaled on a stake by Kwassau. Others like Zinyip Katunku and Kuntai Mado of Mashan were said to have been buried alive in the Battle of Santswan with the Kaduna River said to have been covered with blood. In September 1902, Kwassau was charged and arrested by Captain Abadie, and later deposed to Zungeru, the new Protectorate capital. In March 1903, he was moved to Lokoja. Kwassau was known as the ‘’Sarkin Zazzau’’, but after him, the next ruler of Zazzau, Aliyu dan Sidi, who was turbanned in the same month was known as ‘Emir of Zaria’.

Still in March 1903, the British marched from Keffi against Jama’a Daroro, a Zazzau tributary enclave, without opposition from the Fulani rulers. In October 1904, Jama’a was placed under Nassarawa Province, and a military station was established in Jama’a with a WAFF detachment stationed there to give support to the emirate. For the first time, Jama’a was to exercise control over ethnic groups they had no previous control over. From there, the British launched attacks on the Agworok, Bajju, Nikyob, Ham, Ninzo, and others nearby. Also, the Fulani rulers of the Hausa enclaves of Kauru and Kajuru with no military capability willingly submitted to the British to gain their favour as Jama’a. Portions of ethnic groups like the Gwong, Ninzo, Agworok, Bajju, Takad, and others of Southern Zaria remained independent with the British only able to subdue all completely in 1915 after prolonged skirmishes. The British officer, J.S. Coleman testified to the resistance in the Middle Belt areas of Northern Nigeria to European domination imposition being more lengthy than elsewhere in the emirates. Led by Major Eustace Crawley, the British took over Atyapland without a fight on April 2, 1903. The Atyap had previously lost many to slave raids and massacre from Kwassau’s wars and did seem not strong enough for another fight.

On September 1, 1903, a letter was sent to Joseph Chamberlain, the Colonial Secretary in London by the acting High Commissioner of the Protectorate of Northern Nigeria after a successful expedition between 17 March to 13 April 1903 by the British from Zaria across to Kubau, Lere, Rukuba, Tsam, Atyap, and Bajju as thus:

These operations were deemed necessary owing to the blocking of roads to the South and the raiding of caravans and murders of many traders by the Godas and Kaje (Bajju) tribes.

The British advanced to Bajjuland from Atyapland. About 45 Bajju men died in the fight, 59 were taken prisoners, and their villages were looted and burnt. On November 7, 1904, the Tilde Expedition, which was a joint operation of the British Residents of Bauchi and Nasarawa Provinces began in Jama’a against the Agworok. A WAFF company was established at Kachia in 1905. In 1907, Atyapland was placed under the Kauru (later renamed Katuka) District. Zangon Katab District was later created in 1912. But it was ruled by Hausa administrators from Zaria. From the District Head (DH) down to the District Messengers including Native Authority officers, they were all Hausa. It was the Hausa officials who then appointed the Atyap Village Heads.

In 1909, the British launched the Ninzo Patrols of subjugation from Jama’a. The Assistant Resident of Jama’a then was Captain A.J.N. Tremearne.

==== Native Authority ====
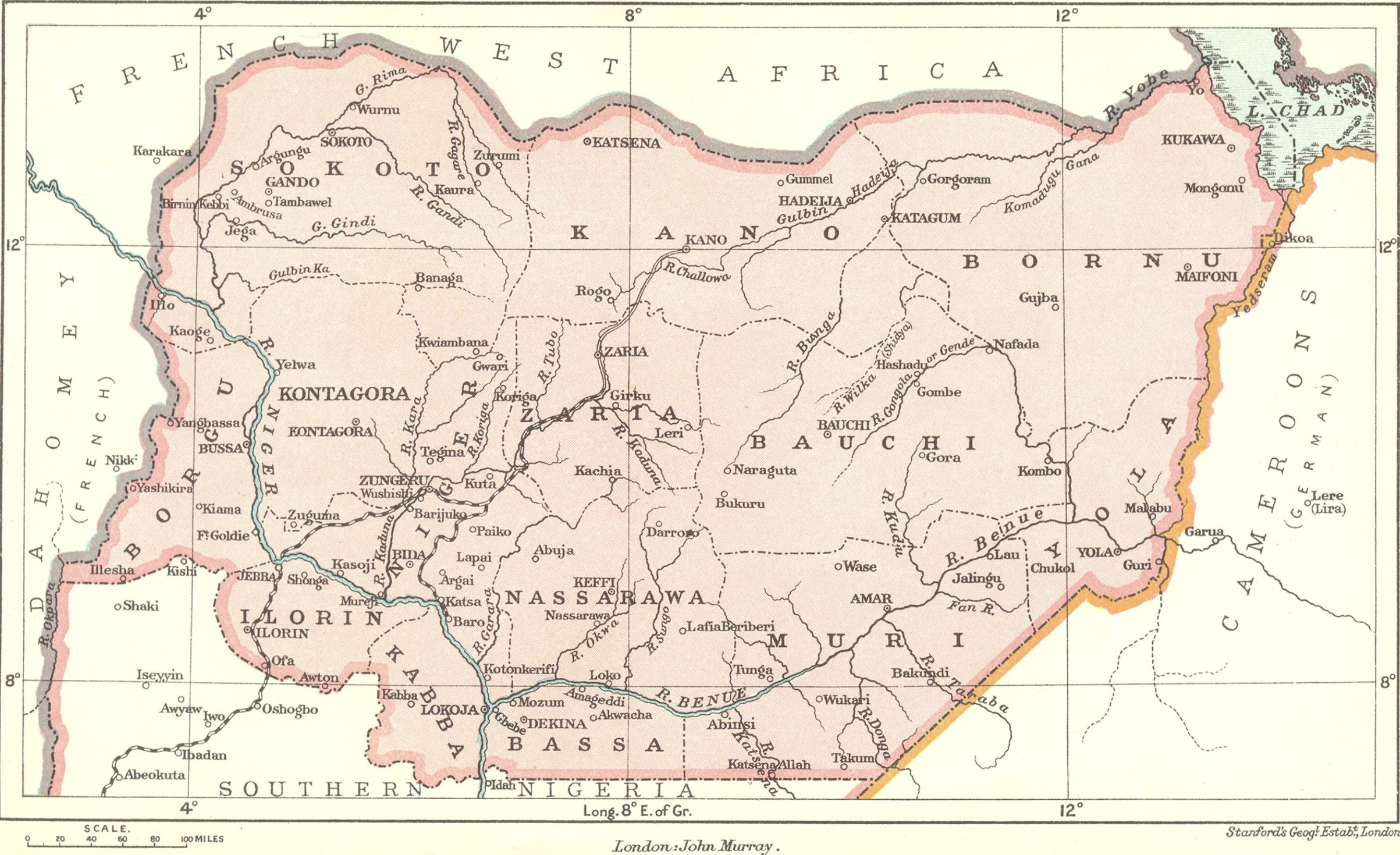
Protectorate of Northern Nigeria in 1911

Between 1907–1908, the Native Authority (NA) policy was created by the British, and made to operate in Southern Zaria as it would in an emirate, which the area was not a part of before colonialism. The Zaria feudal ruler (Emir) reported to the British Resident, and the District Heads reported to the Emir. Both the District Heads and Native Authority officials were entirely Hausa, Fulani, or Muslim and were appointed to lord over the non-Muslim and non-Hausa populations without a previous history of sovereignty over them. Only Village Heads appointed by the District Heads were indigenous.

==== Amalgamation of the Northern and Southern Nigeria Protectorate and onwards (1914–1960) ====
===== Geopolitics =====
In spite of the rejection of Sir F.D. Lugard's idea of amalgamation by many both in the Southern (including the Lagos Colony which joined the South in 1906) and in the Northern Nigeria Protectorates, the amalgamation still went ahead. On January 1, 1914, the two protectorates became the British Colonial Nigeria.

Southern Zaria was administered from Zaria which had no prior power over most of it before the coming of the British colonialists. In his article, Northern Nigeria published in January 1904, Sir F.D. Lugard spoke of the great pagan tribes of Central Nigeria who are brave in war, speak diverse languages and have never been conquered by the Fulani, citing examples like the Gwaris, Kejes, and Kedaras. This was the same with the Jos Plateau which when the British occupied Bauchi in 1902 came under the direct administration of the Bauchi Province which had no earlier common history or control over it, until 1926 when the Plateau Province was created. But unlike the Jos Plateau, Southern Zaria never got its Province.

By 1920, Southern Zaria (officially Southern Zaria Division of Zaria Province) comprised 12 of the 27 districts in the Zaria Province, namely:

District	District Head's Title
Bikaratu	Dan Galadima
Bishini	Sarkin Zana
Chawai	Sarkin Chawai
Jere	Sarkin Jere
Kachia	Ma’aji
Kagarko	Sarkin Kagarko
Kajuru	Sarkin Kajuru
Katab	Katuka
Kauru	Sarkin Kauru
Kudaru	Turaki Karami
Kujama	Woinya
Lere	Wali

In 1925, the Zaria Resident noted the need to establish ‘Pagan’ courts for the animists who preferred to stay away from the Alkali courts with Muslim judges, who the ruling class used to suppress the commoners whether Hausa or indigenous Southern Zaria peoples. According to the Resident,

I am not altogether satisfied with the working of the Native Courts generally. In the Pagan Areas, little or no use is made of Moslem Alkali courts except by the minority Moslem population.

An observation was made in Resident Laing’s Zaria Province Annual Report of 1927 that the natives would rather stay away than take their conflicts to the District Head or the Alkali (Judge) due to discriminatory practices. When finally these pagan courts were established, there could not be agreement as to who to preside over the court from among the indigenous groups like in the case of the Atyap. They ended up choosing the Hausa District Head to preside over the court. Again, the Southern Zaria ruling class would use the pagan courts to usurp judgement in their favour, as in the Alkali court. The peasants again lost hope in the Pagan courts in the Atyap area.

On November 1, 1934, the British following the request of Governor Donald Cameron dated October 3, 1934, moved three districts in the Nassarawa Province namely: Moroa, Jaba, and Kagoro to Zaria Province. A portion of the Bajju (including the Fantswam) in the Plateau Province were also moved and merged with their relatives in the Katab District of the Zaria Province, like the Ham (Jaba) in Kachia District who were merged with their relatives from Nassarawa Province. These would become the only districts in Zaria Province with Indigenous and non-Muslim District Heads. Such independent districts were more peaceful. The unification of these groups under the Zaria Province gave birth to the Southern Zaria identity. Also, the discontent of having a portion of a particular ethnic group in an independent district subsequently made chiefdoms, and another portion under a foreign District Head brought in dissatisfaction among the Southern Zaria groups which would lead to agitations for more independence from Hausa and Fulani rule. Yohanna Simon referred to the colonialism in Southern Zaria as an "Anglo/Hausa/Fulani Rule".

Still in 1934, Chawai lost its independent status as a district, and was merged with Zangon Katab.

===== Taxation and anti-colonial protests =====
Forced labour and taxation were introduced by the British shortly after the colonialists took control. The peasants were also made to produce cash crops rather than the food crops they were used to.

In 1910, the Atyap people in the Zangon Katab District rebelled against both the British colonialist representative and the Hausa District Head for their increasing demands for forced labour, with the British reacting by use of force to quell the opposition. As of 1913, the pagan areas of Zaria Province paid 10% of their grain harvest to the colonial authorities termed Zakka, which was paid ‘per hoe’, with some exceptions where the land was not so fertile.

Aliyu ɗan Sidi (r. 1903-1921), the Emir of Zaria, was charged with corruption and misuse of authority and was removed from office by the British in early 1921. He was reported to have diverted and sold food meant for prisoners for his gain, thereby letting the prisoners die of abandonment. He was also accused of keeping a thief in his court and had used threats and intimidation to stop his subjects from making complaints to the colonial authorities.

Another uprising occurred in Zangon Katab in 1922. Facing hardship, the Atyap and Bajju refused to pay their taxes. They were reported by the District Heads of Zangon Katab and Kachia to the Emir of Zaria, who stressed that they could not ensure order among the peasants and requested a colonial military escort and a political officer to Zangon Katab. The British did so, and in the end, while they were able to quell the uprising, they were not able to arrest the leaders of the resistance who had escaped from the District, with one of them injuring a companion of the District Head [of Zangon Katab].

== Geography ==
=== Administrative divisions ===
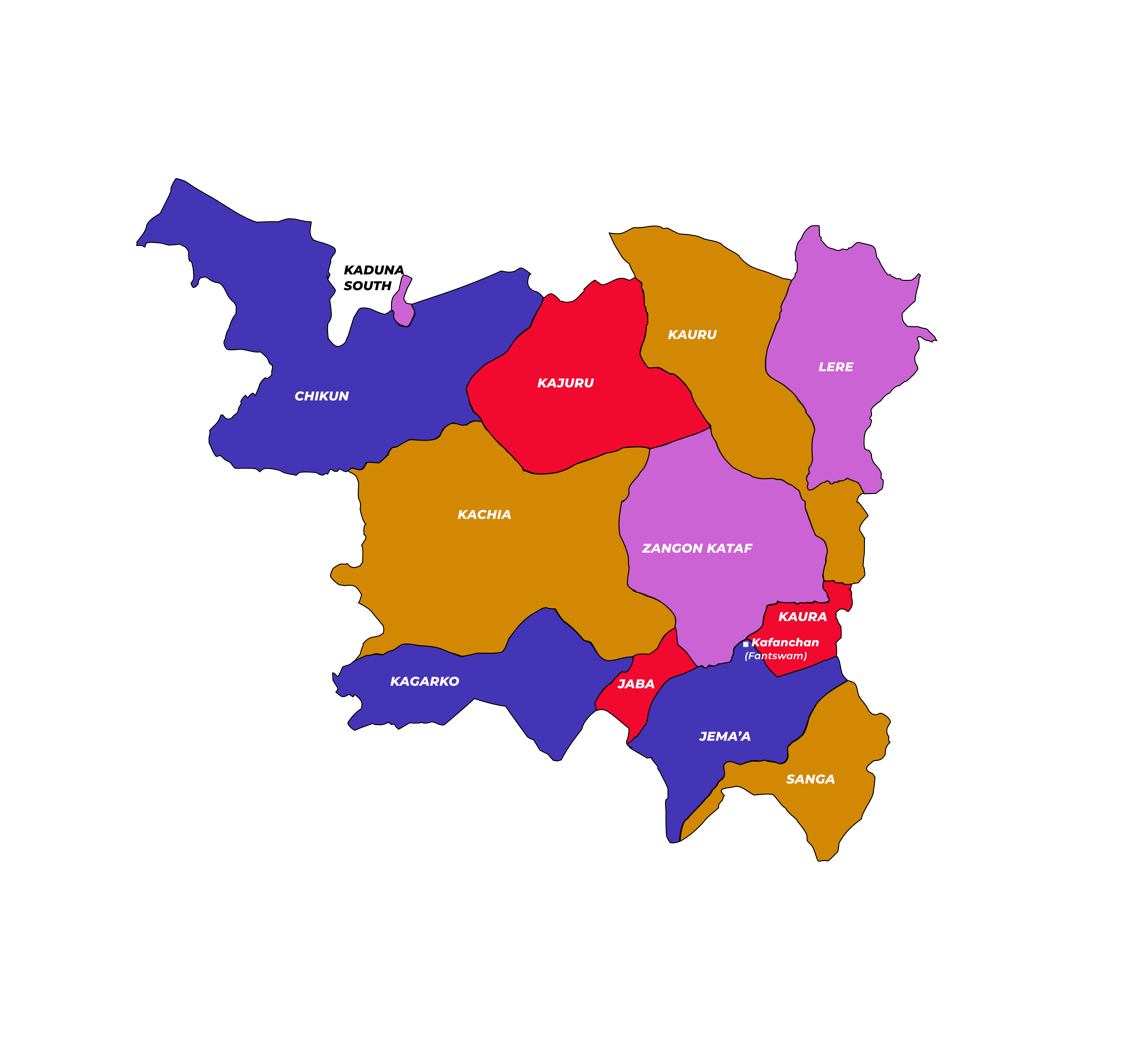
Map of Southern Kaduna by Local Government Area

The table below contains the 12 Local Government Areas of Southern Kaduna:

LGA	Headquarters
Chikun	Kujama
Jaba	Kwoi
Jema'a	Kafanchan
Kachia	Kachia Town
Kaduna South	Makera
Kagarko	Kagarko Town
Kajuru	Kajuru Town
Kaura	Kaura Town
Kauru	Kauru Town
Lere	Saminaka
Sanga	Gbantu
Zangon Kataf	Zonkwa

== Demographics ==
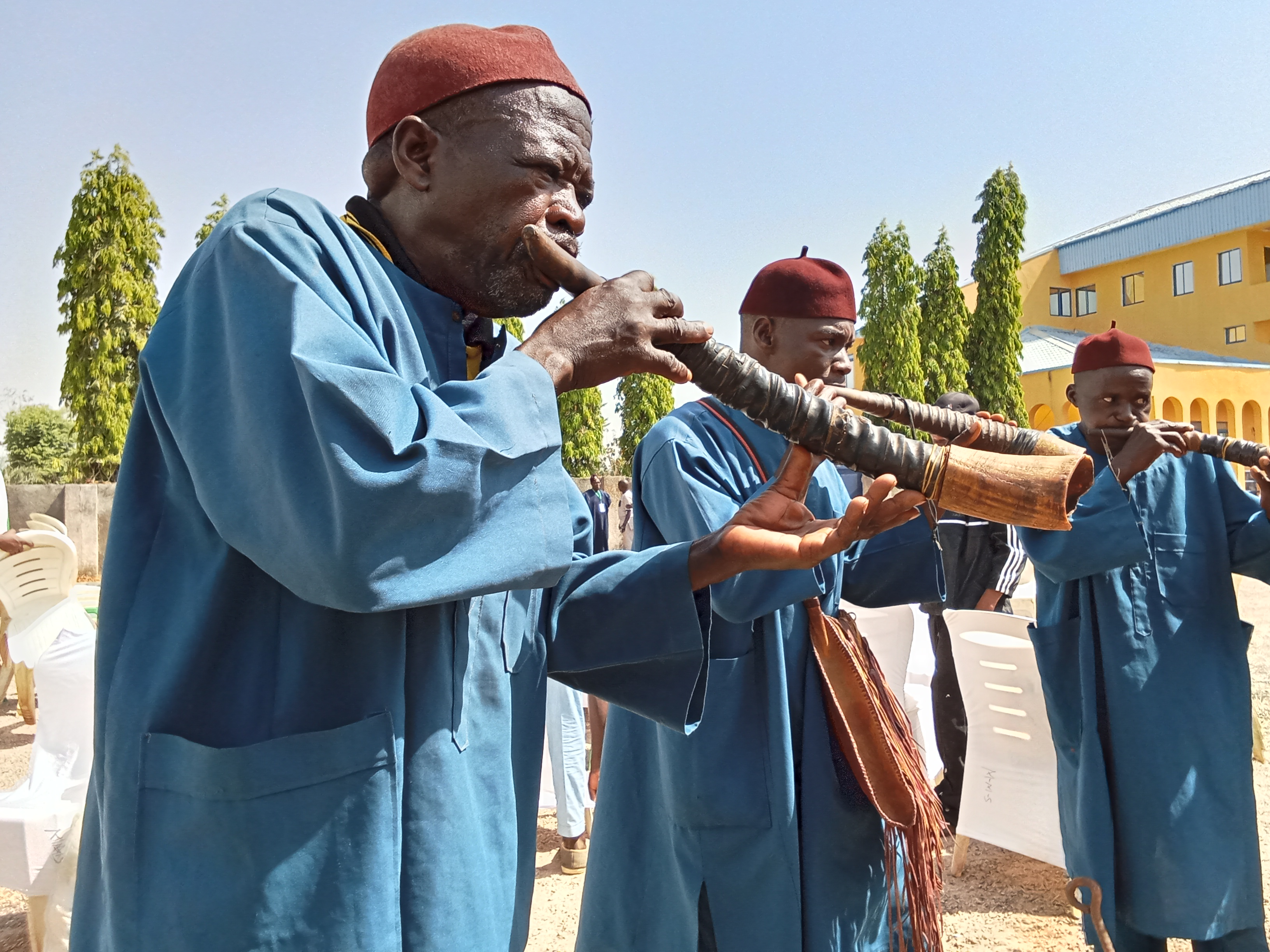
Gugwa group at Ayet 2023

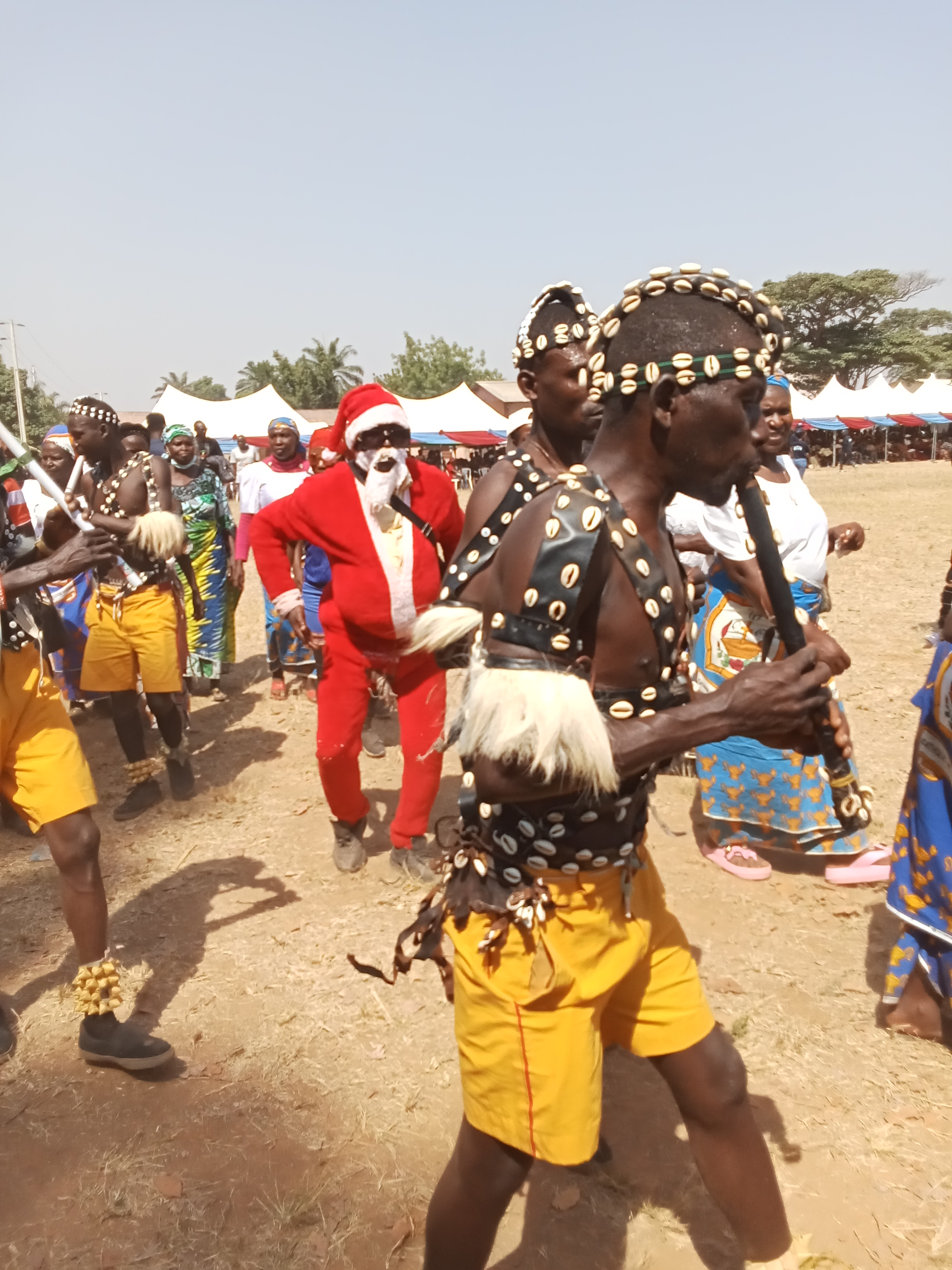
Asharwa/Ajak flute-blowers at Afan 2024

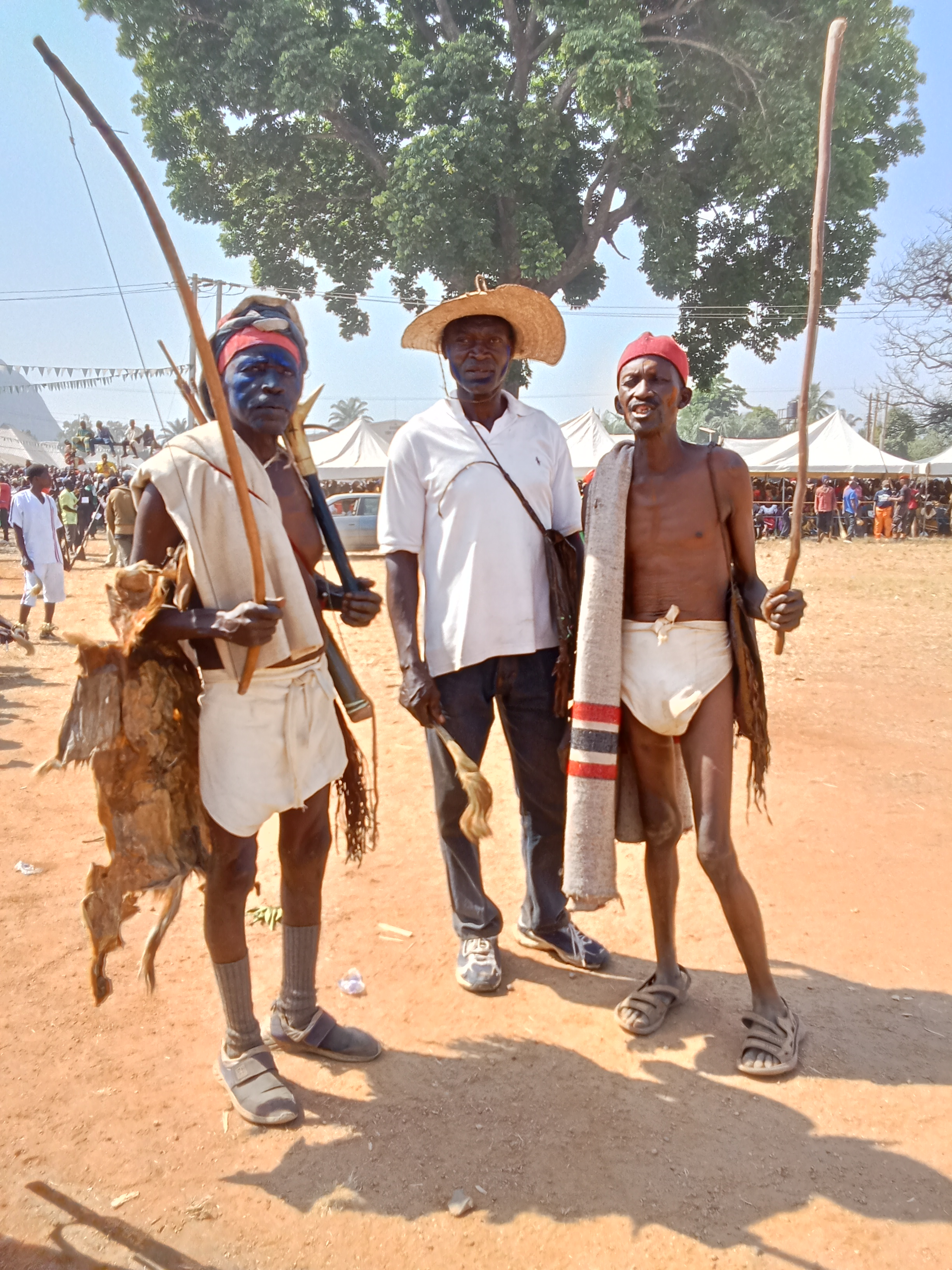
Əgworog archers at Afan 2024

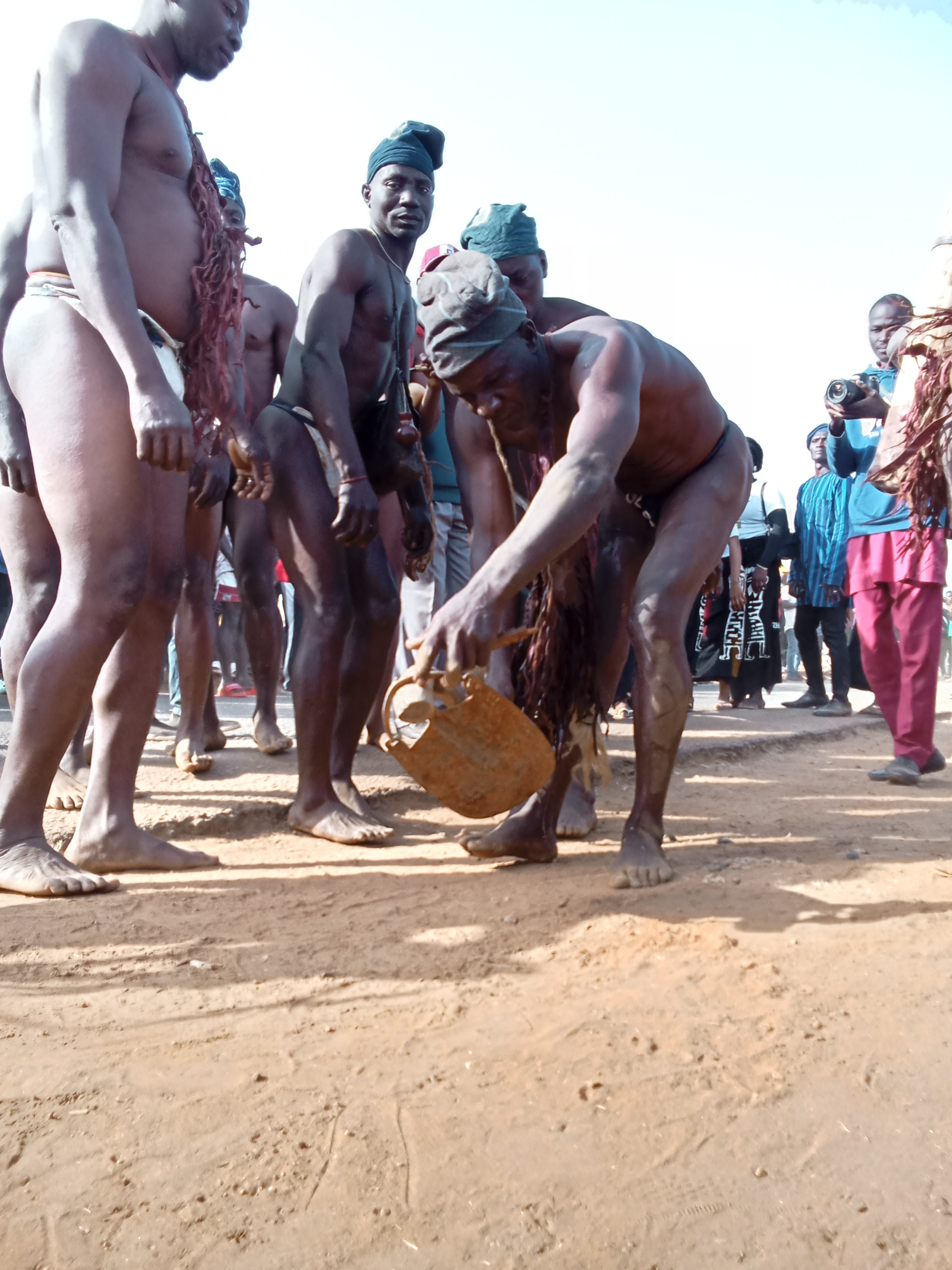
Gbagyi dancers at SK Fest 2023

=== Ethnic composition ===
Southern Kaduna is composed of closely related ethnic groups and several subgroups united by a common culture and history. James (2000) classified these people based on their ethno-linguistic affinities under the topic "The Middle Belt (Composition of the Nok Culture Area)", and grouping the subgroups into the following groups:

==== The Proto-Plateau ethnolinguistic cluster ====
S/N	Groups	Sub-groups
I.	Northern or Adara Group	Adara (Kadara); Ada (Kuturmi); Ajure Adara (Kadara of Idon); Anumafa Adara (Kadara Kateri); Semi Ajure (Ankuwa, Gora); Bakulu (Ikulu)
II.	Western or Koro Group	Koro Myamya; Koro Achel, Ashe or Wachi; Koro Ala or Agweshi; Koro Ham or Adong/Gbaham
III.	Ham or Northwestern Group	Ham Kpop (Jaba Kwoi); Ham Ngat Ham (Jaban Katari); Ham Shambang (Samban); Ham Duhyah (Jaban Lungu); Ham Gwong (Kagoma); Ham Kworri (Chori); Ham Det (Faik/Kenyi); Ham Netkun/Netwho - Gbaham; Ham Nyakpah (Yeskwa); Ham Kong/Rhuini (Kamantan)
IV.	Nerzit or Kataf (Atyap) Group	Atyap (Kataf, Katab); Bajju (Kaje); Əgworog (Aegworok, Oegworok, Baguro, Kagoro); Asholyio (Osholio, Asholio, Moro'a); Fantswam (Kafanchan); Bakulu (Ikulu); Anghan (Angan, Kamantan); Atakad (Atakat, Attakar); Atyecharak (Atyacherak, Attachirak, Kachechere); Terri (Challa, Chara); Atuku (tuku) Kuu""
V.	South-western (Aninka) Group	Ninzo; Northern Mada; Gbantu (Gwantu); Nindem; Nikyob (Kaninkon); Kanufi; Nungu; Buh - Ayu; Ningeshe; Nandu; Numana

The above grouping on the Proto-Plateau ethnolinguistic clusters was however modified based on the spoken languages by Blench (2008) as follows:

S/N	Groups	Sub-groups
I.	Northwest or Adara Group	Eda, Ada; Edra, Adara; Bakulu; Ẹjẹgha (Idon); Doka; Ẹhwa (Iku-Gora-Ankwe)
II.	Atyap (Nerzit, Nenzit) Group	Bajju; Atyap; Agworok (Kagoro); Takad (Attakar); Atyecarak (Kacicere); Asholyio; Fantswam (Kafancan); Atuku (Tuku)
III.	Koro Group	Ashe; Tinɔr (Waci-Myamya); Idũ, Gwara; Nyenkpa-Barde
IV.	Ham Group	Shamang; Cori; Ham; Zhire; Shang
V.	Gwong Group	Gwong (Kagoma); Anɡhan (Kamanton)
VI.	Ninzo Group	Ninzo (Ninzam); Bu-Niŋkada; Mada; Numana-Nunku-Gbantu-Numbu; Ningye-Ninka; Anib; Nikyob; Nindem; Nungu; Ayu
VII.	Ndun Group	Ndun (Nandu)
VIII.	Alumu Group	Sambe; He also said that Nisam is a presumed Plateau language once spoken in Nince Village, Kaduna State, however, its place within the Plateau branch cannot be ascertained due to the lack of linguistic data and that in 2005, there was only one speaker of Nisam.

==== The Proto-Kainji ethnolinguistic cluster ====
S/N	Groups	Sub-groups
I.	Eastern Kainji Group	Atsam (Chawai); Amap (Amo); Abisi (Piti); Kuzamani (Shuwa-Zamani); Ngmgbang (Ribam); Dinani (Dingi); Ribina
II.	Eastern Kainji Group	Agbiri (Gure); Aniragu (Kahugu); Akurmi (Kurama); Koonu (Kono); Vono (Kiballo); Tumi (Kitimi); Nuno-Kaivi (Kaibi); Mala-Ruma (Rumaya/Ruruma); Abin (Binawa); Kuvori (Surubu); Atumu (Kinuku); Shuwa-Zamani (Kuzamani); Dungi (Dungu)

==== The Proto-Nupoid ethnolinguistic cluster ====
S/N	Groups	Sub-groups
I.	Gbagyi (Gwari) Group	Gbagyi-Gbari (Gwari)

==== The Proto-West Chadic languages ====
Outside of James (2000)'s classification lie the groups from the Proto-West Chadic ethnolinguistic cluster:

S/N	Groups	Sub-groups
I.	West Chadic	Gwandara (an afro-asiatic group, related to the Hausa, said to have migrated from Kano.); Sha (a migrant group from Bokkos, Plateau State.)

=== Population ===
The Southern kaduna population is estimated to be over 4.5 million people out of the estimated 8.5 million population in Kaduna state in 2016. Predicted 5.1 million people out of 12 million predicted population of Kaduna State in 2021. The common general languages spoken in the area are Hausa, English and the Nigerian Pidgin.

=== Languages ===
Southern Kaduna consists of a diverse minority of ethnolinguistic groups, who speak languages belonging to the Niger–Congo and West Chadic language groups. Below are the languages and dialects spoken by the people of Southern Kaduna:

LGA	Languages
Chikun	Gbagyi
Jaba	Ashe; Duya; Hyam
Jema'a	Anib; Ashe; Berom; Duya; Fantswam; Gyong; Hyam; Jju; Mada; Kyoli; Nikyob-Nindem; Ninzo; Nungu; Nyankpa; Shamang; Tyap; Tyuku Zhire; Numana
Kachia	Adara; Doka; Gbagyi; Hyam; Iku-Gora-Ankwa; Ikulu; Jju; Nghan; Koro Wachi; Ada; Shamang; Tyap; Zhire
Kaduna South	Adara; Gbagyi; Hausa; Idoma; Igbo; Tyap; Yoruba
Kagarko	Ashe; Duya; Gbagyi; Koro Wachi
Kajuru	Adara; Ajiya; Gbagyi
Kaura	Gworok; Firan; Iten; Takad; Sholyio; Tyap and Tyecarak (Tyecaat)
Kauru	Atsam; Bishi; Dungu; Ikulu; Kaivi; Kivono; Koonu; Kuzamani; Ngmgbang; Rigwe; Ruma; T'kurmi; TiBin; TiNu; TiSeni; Tumala; Tumi; Tyap; TiVori and Hausa
Lere	Lere (now extinct); T'kurmi, Timap; TiNu; Tugbiri-Niragu and Hausa
Sanga	Ahwai; Ayu; Bu-Ninkada; Gwandara; Hasha; Ninzo; Numana; Nungu; Sambe (now extinct); Sha; Turkwam
Zangon Kataf	Ikulu; Jju; Nghan; and Tyap; Tyecarak (Tyecaat)

=== Gallery ===
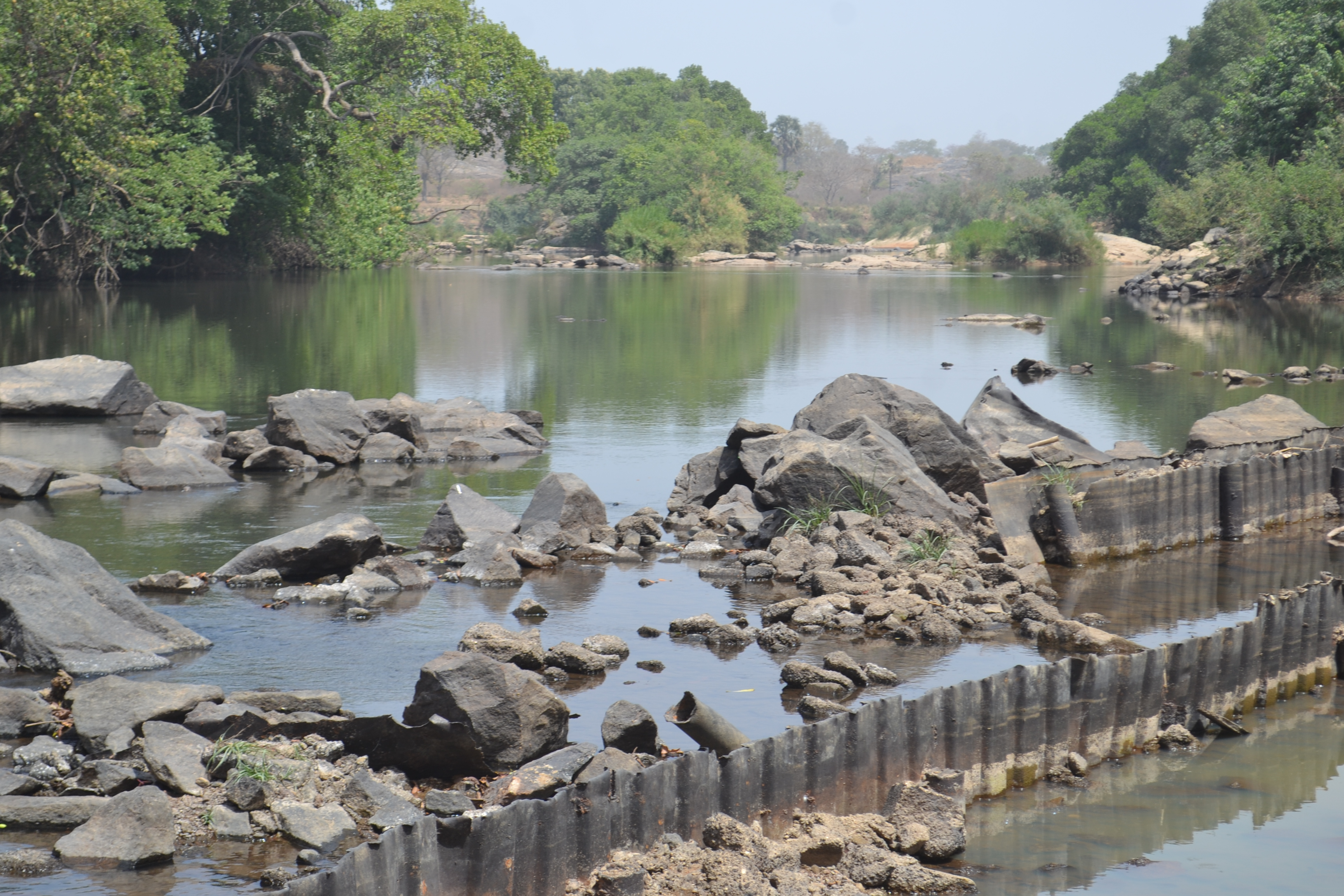
Gurara River, Gidan Akwaja.

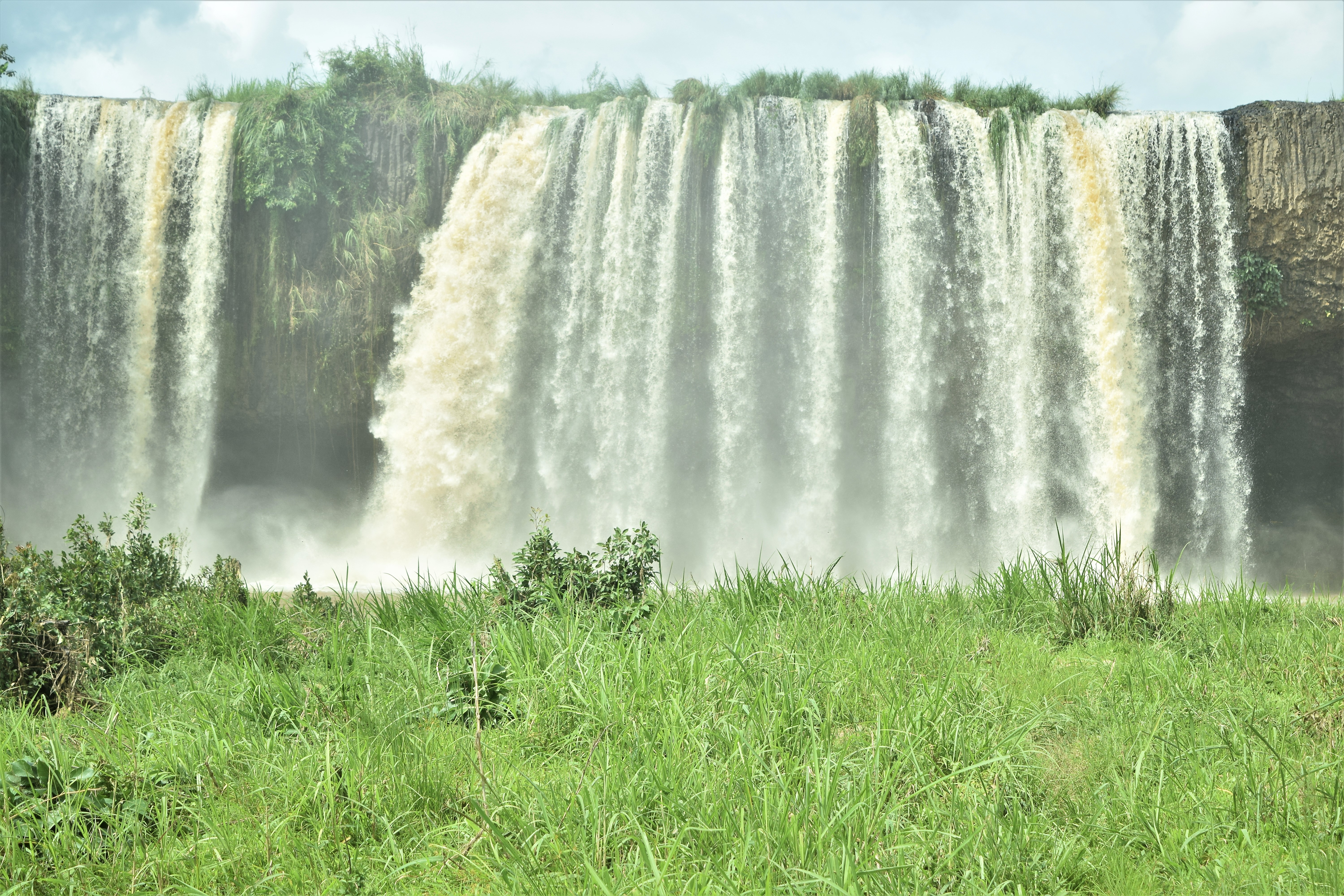
Kabyiek Tityong (River Wonderful waterfalls) Kafanchan

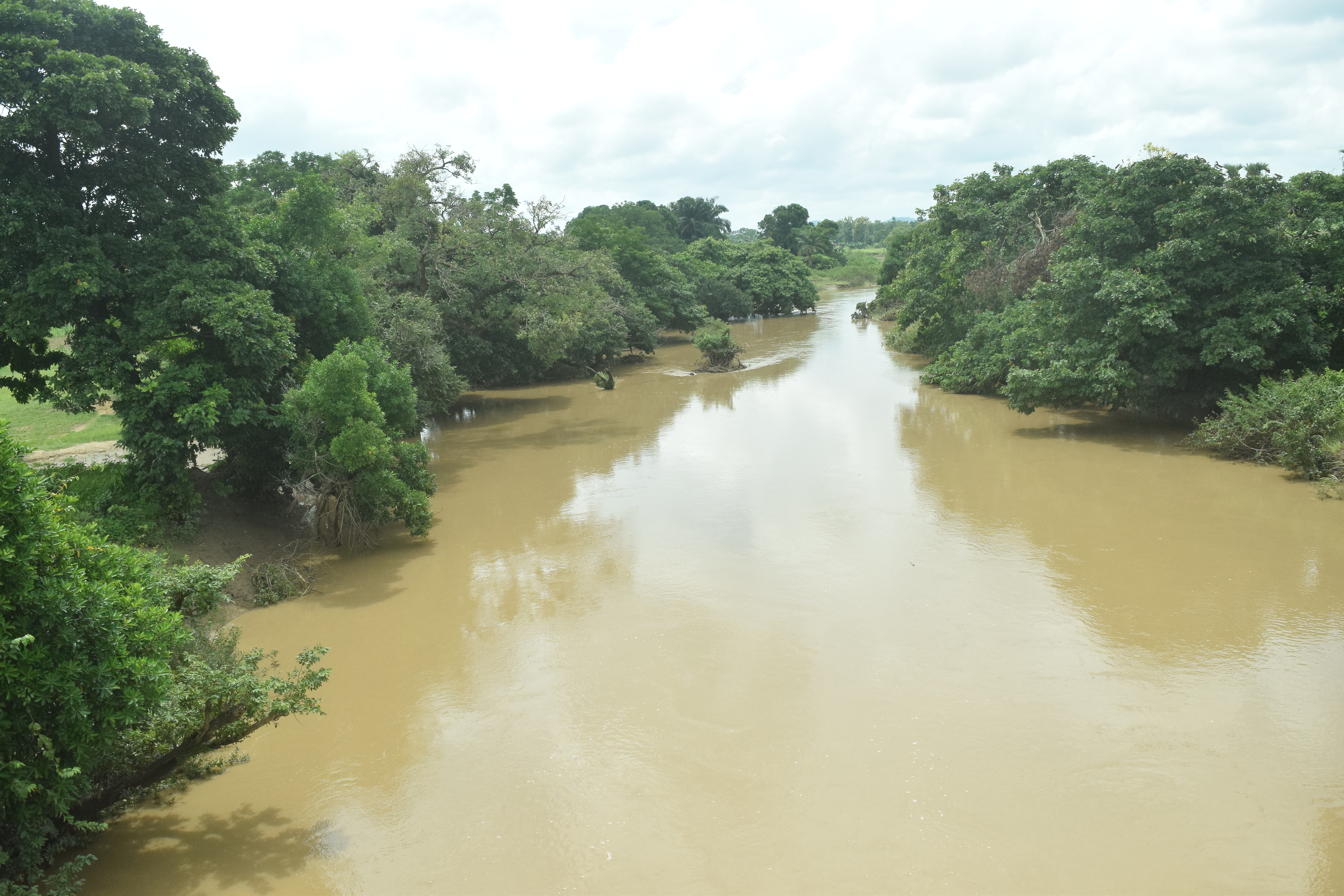
Kogum River, Kogum Station

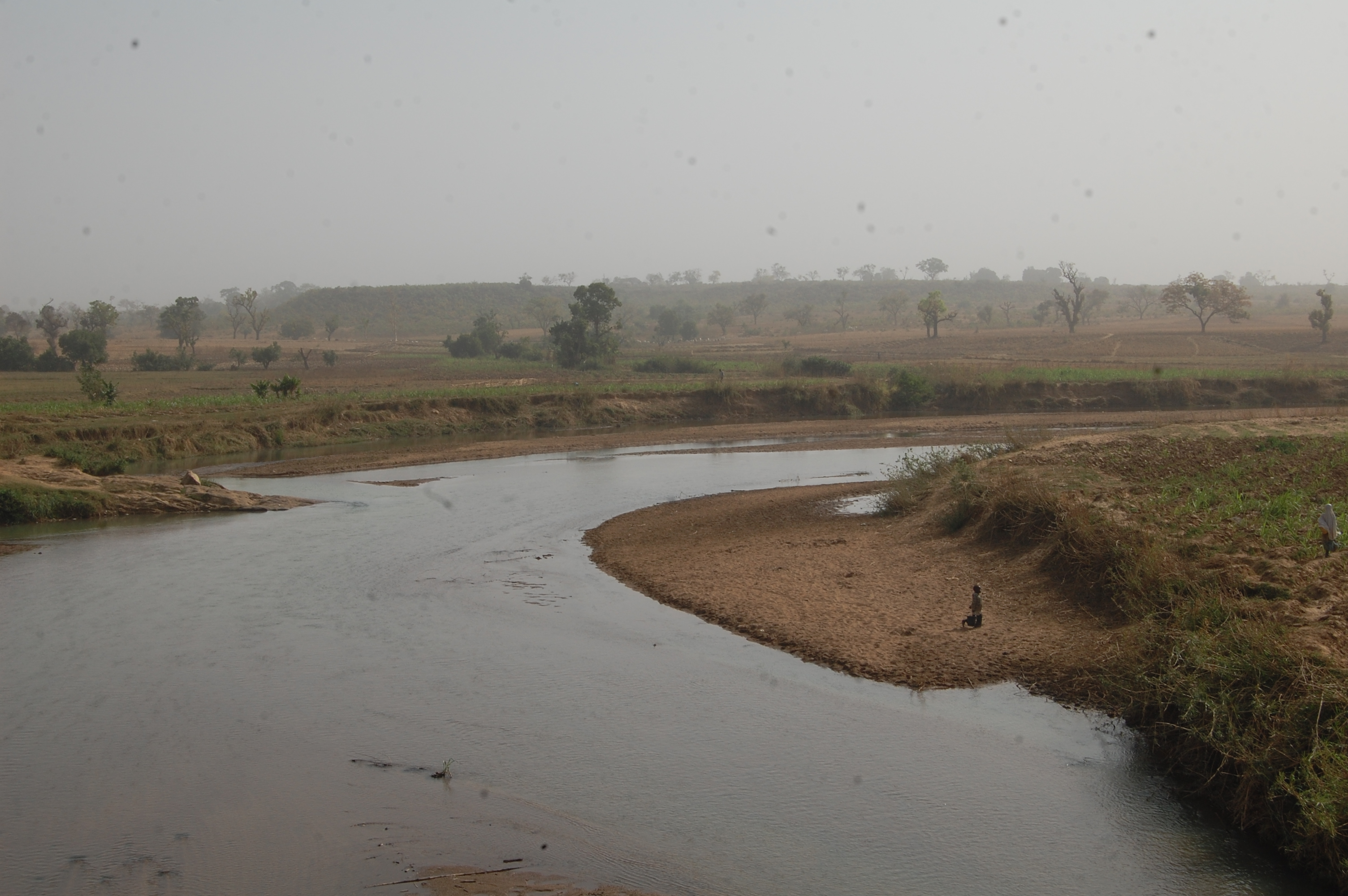
Kaduna River, Zangon Kataf

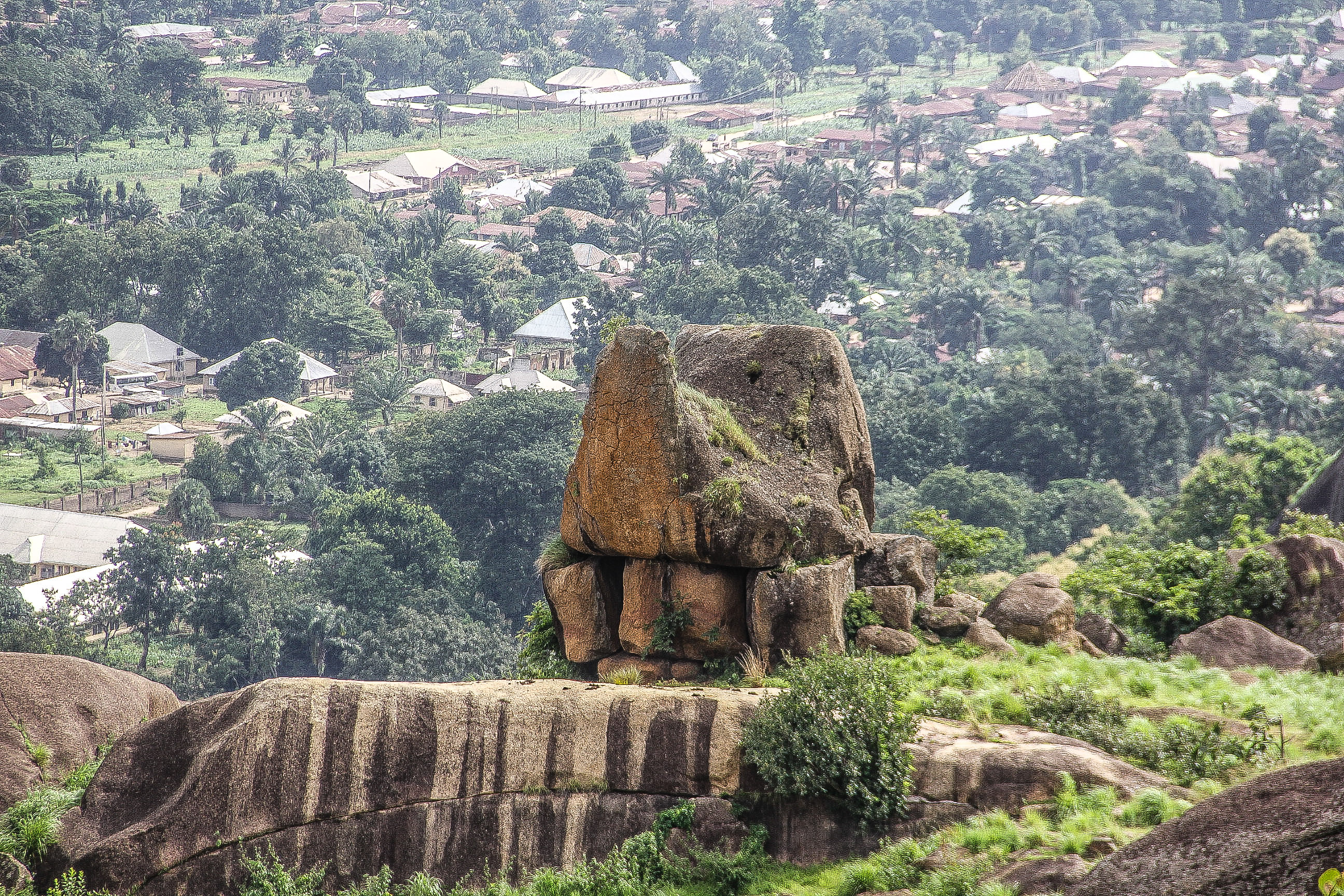
Cuk ntseei (horse's seat), Afan Gworog (Gworog Mountain)

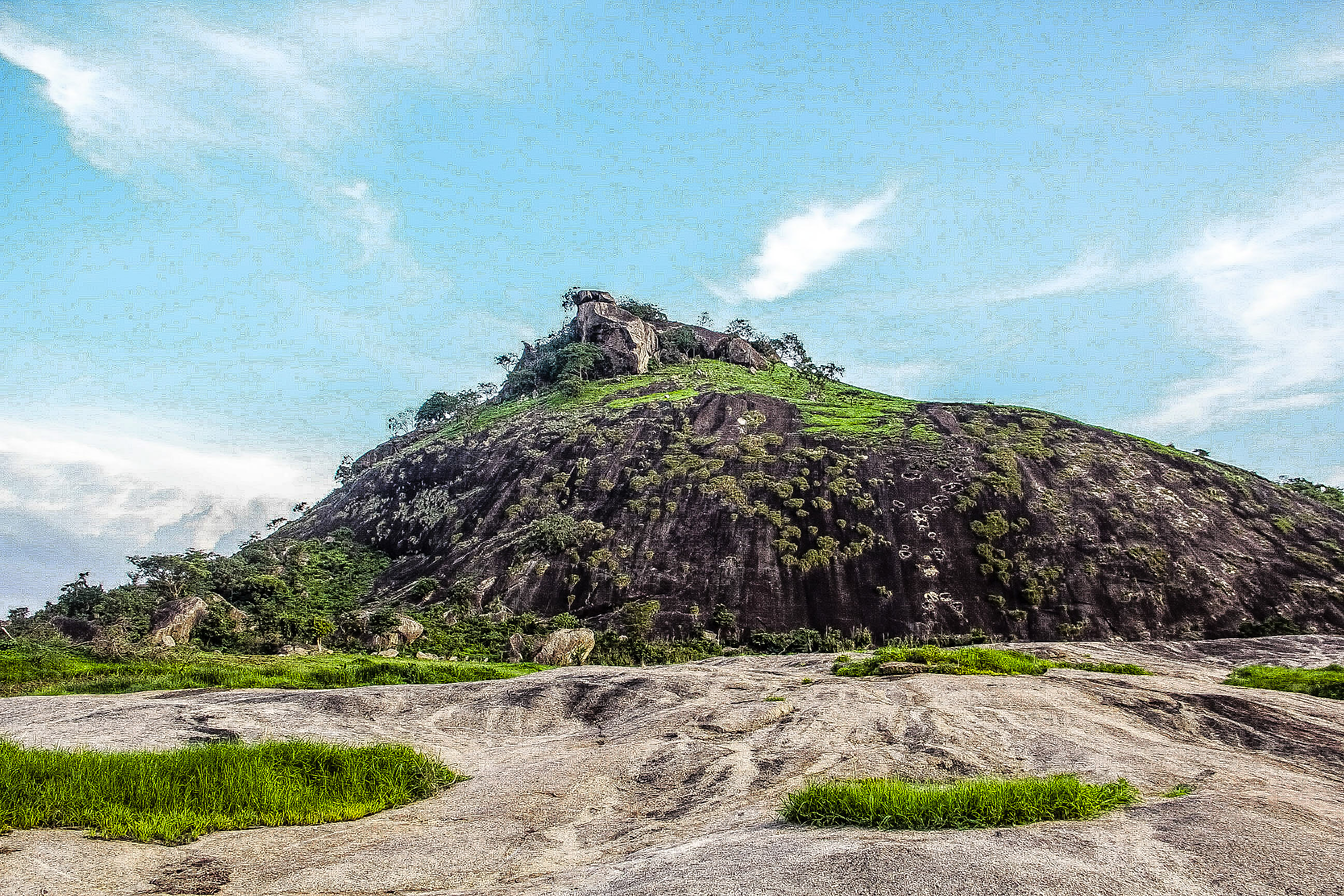
Dung volcanic mountain in Dung (H. Jaban Kogo)

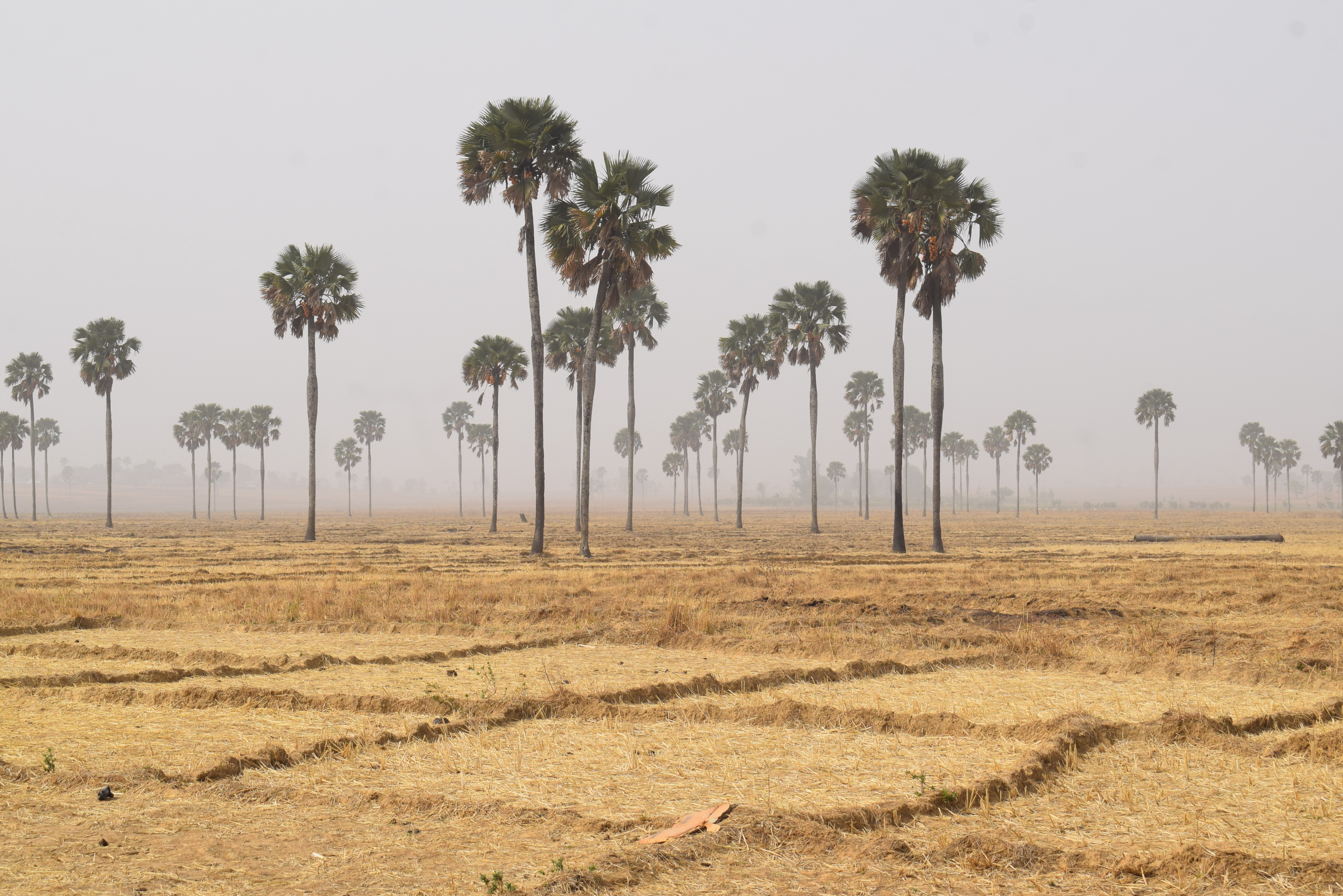
Deleb palm windbreak, Zankan

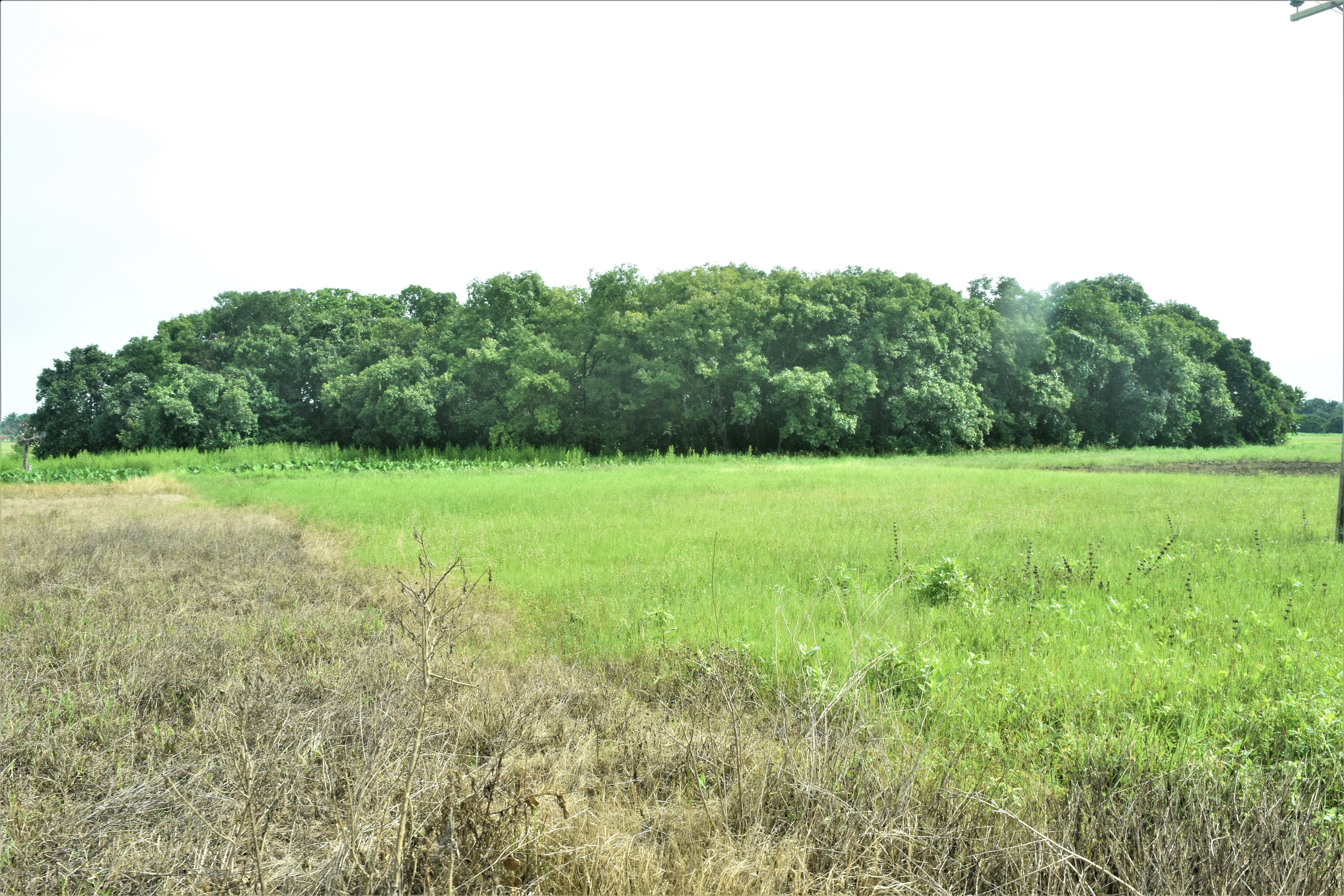
Chen Zat (Fantswam traditional forest), Kafanchan

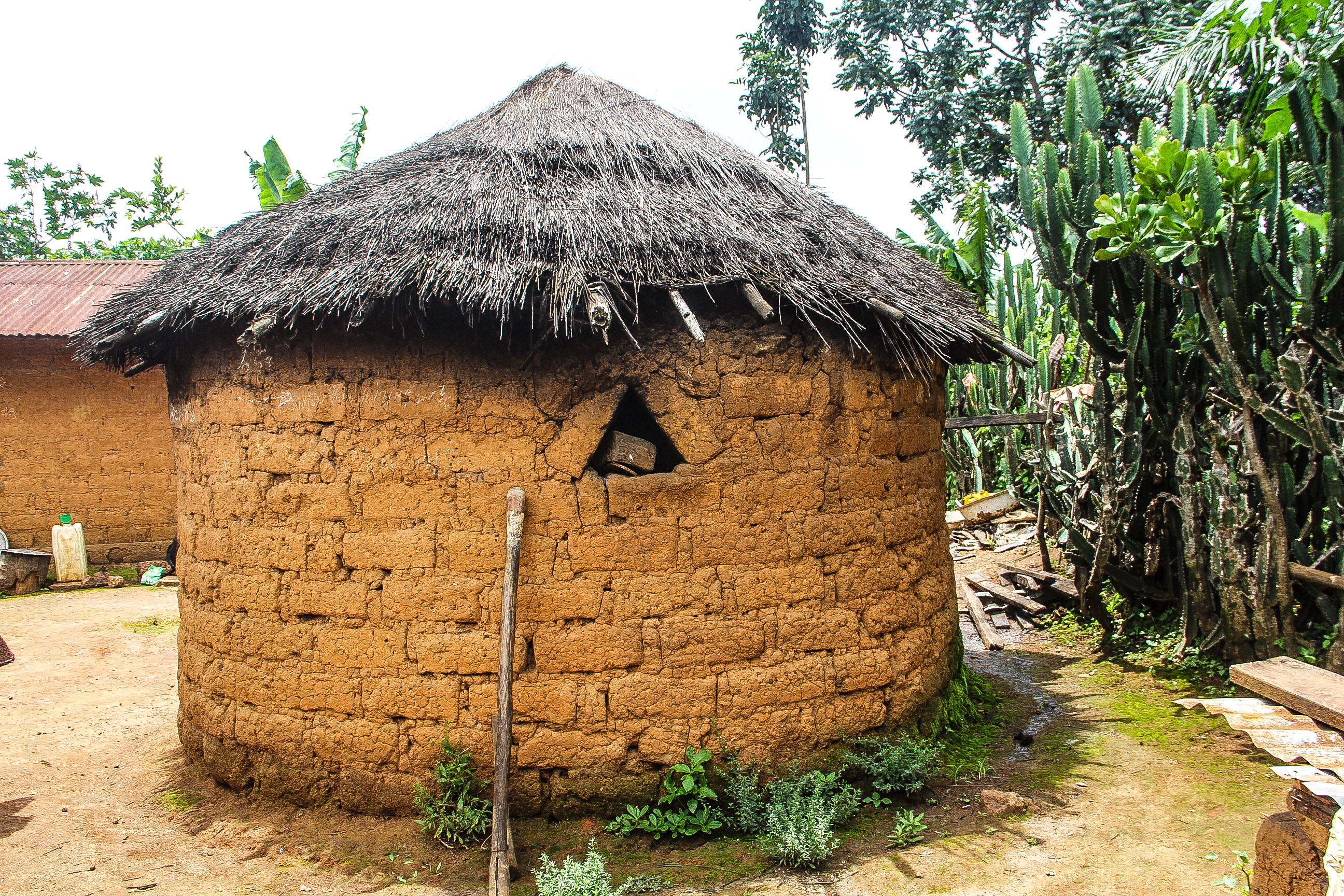
Traditional kitchen, Agban, Gworog Mountain

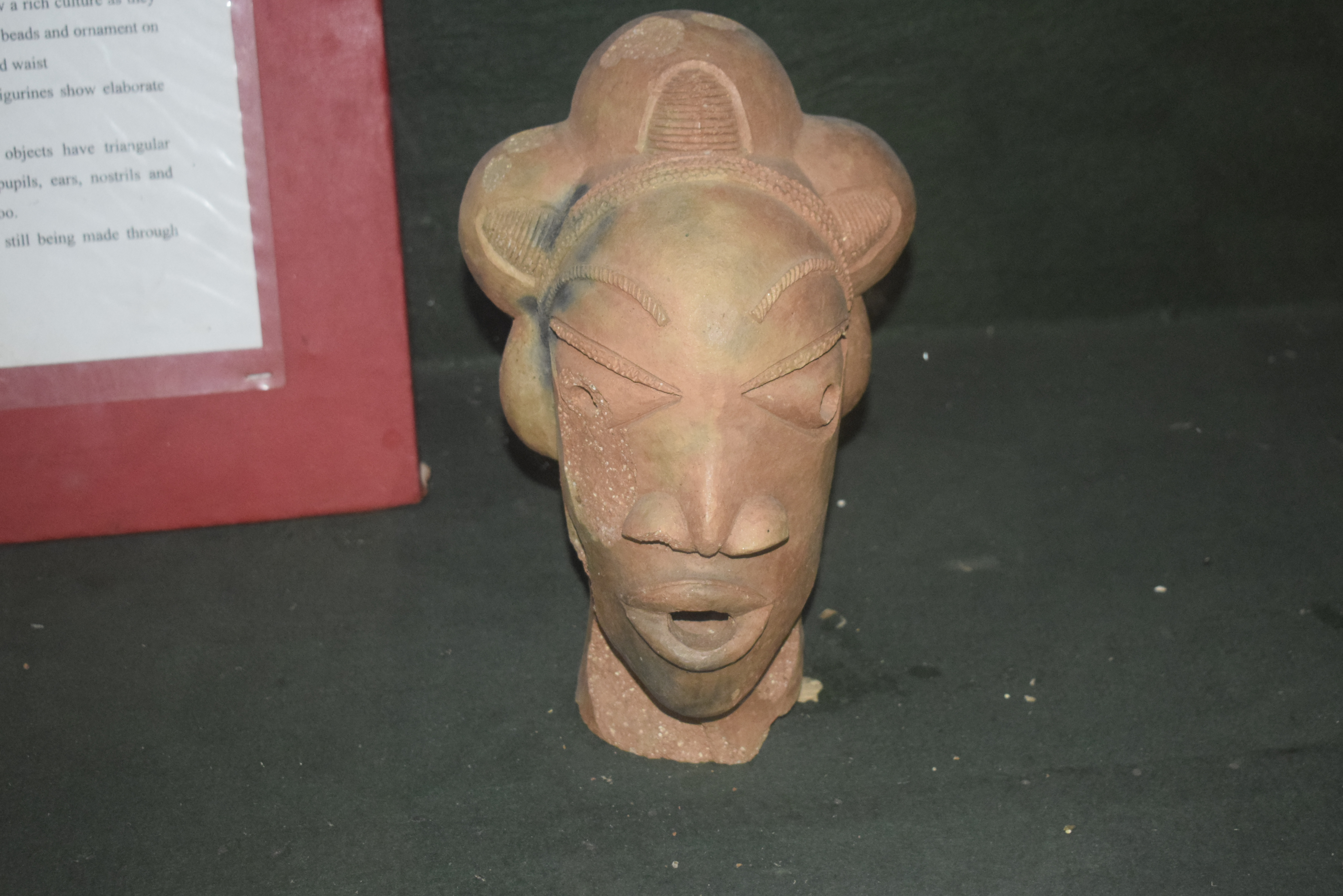
Nok Terracotta head, Nok museum

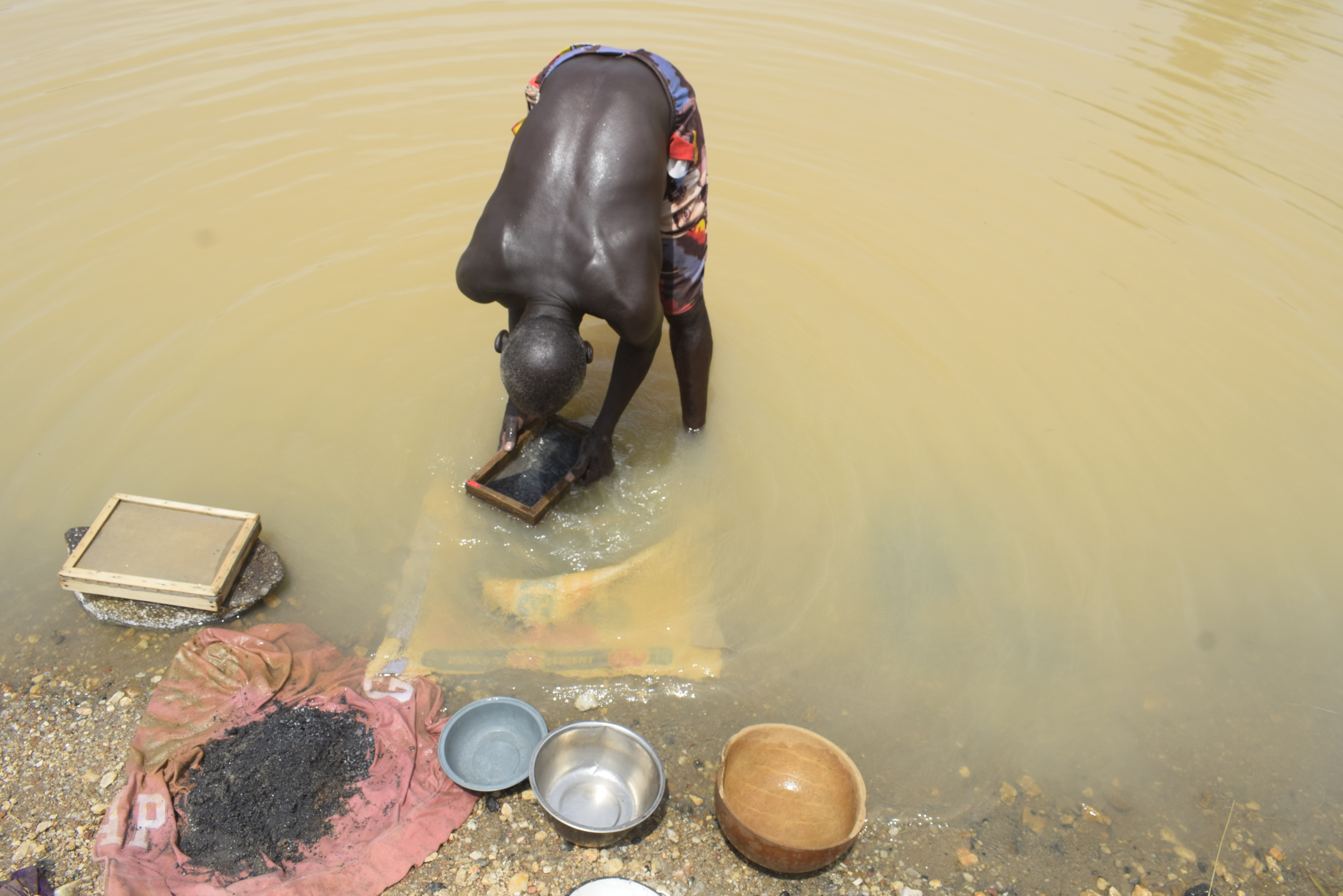
Tin mining, Godogodo

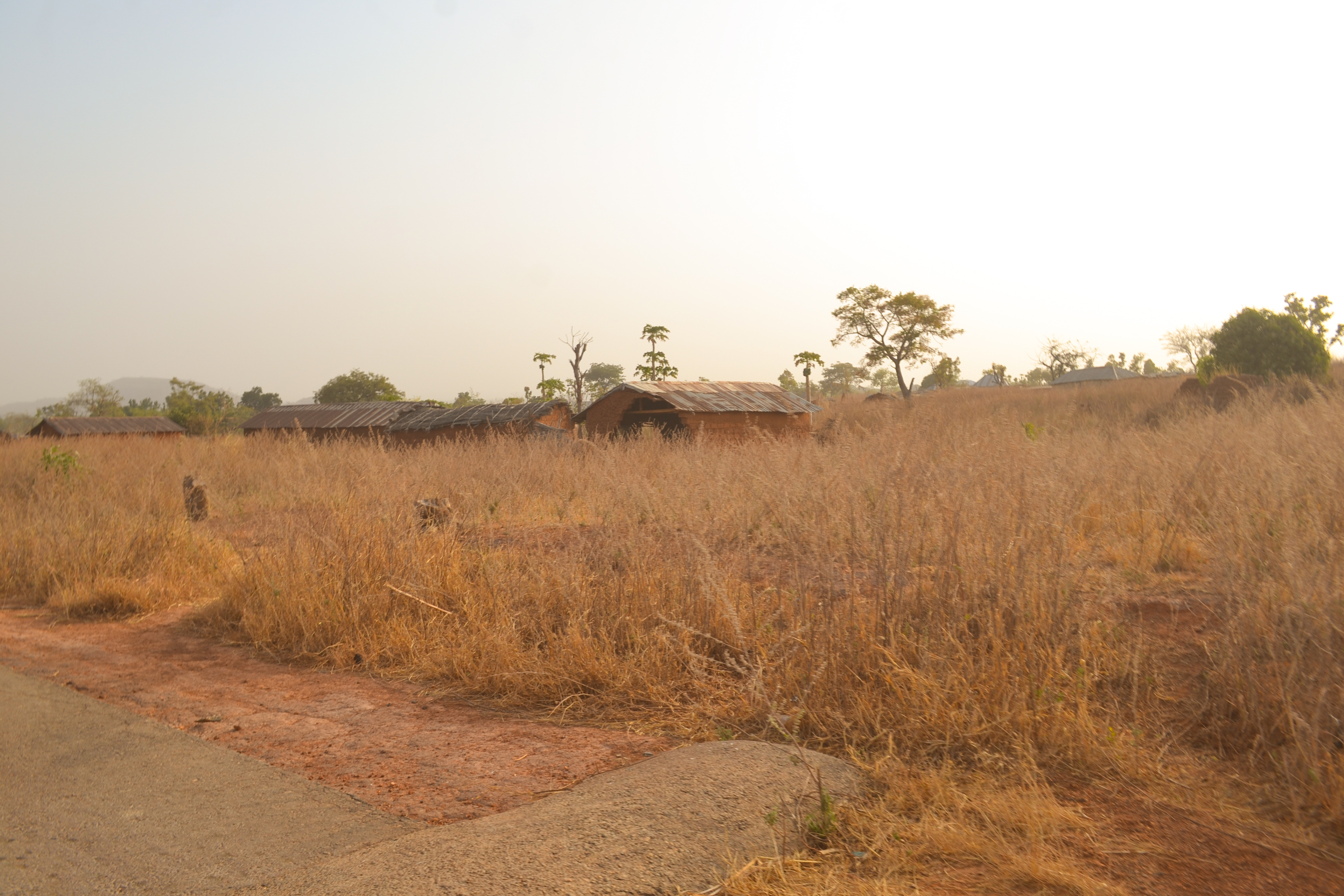
Deserted houses during the harmattan season, Ukpee (H. Ungwan Toka)

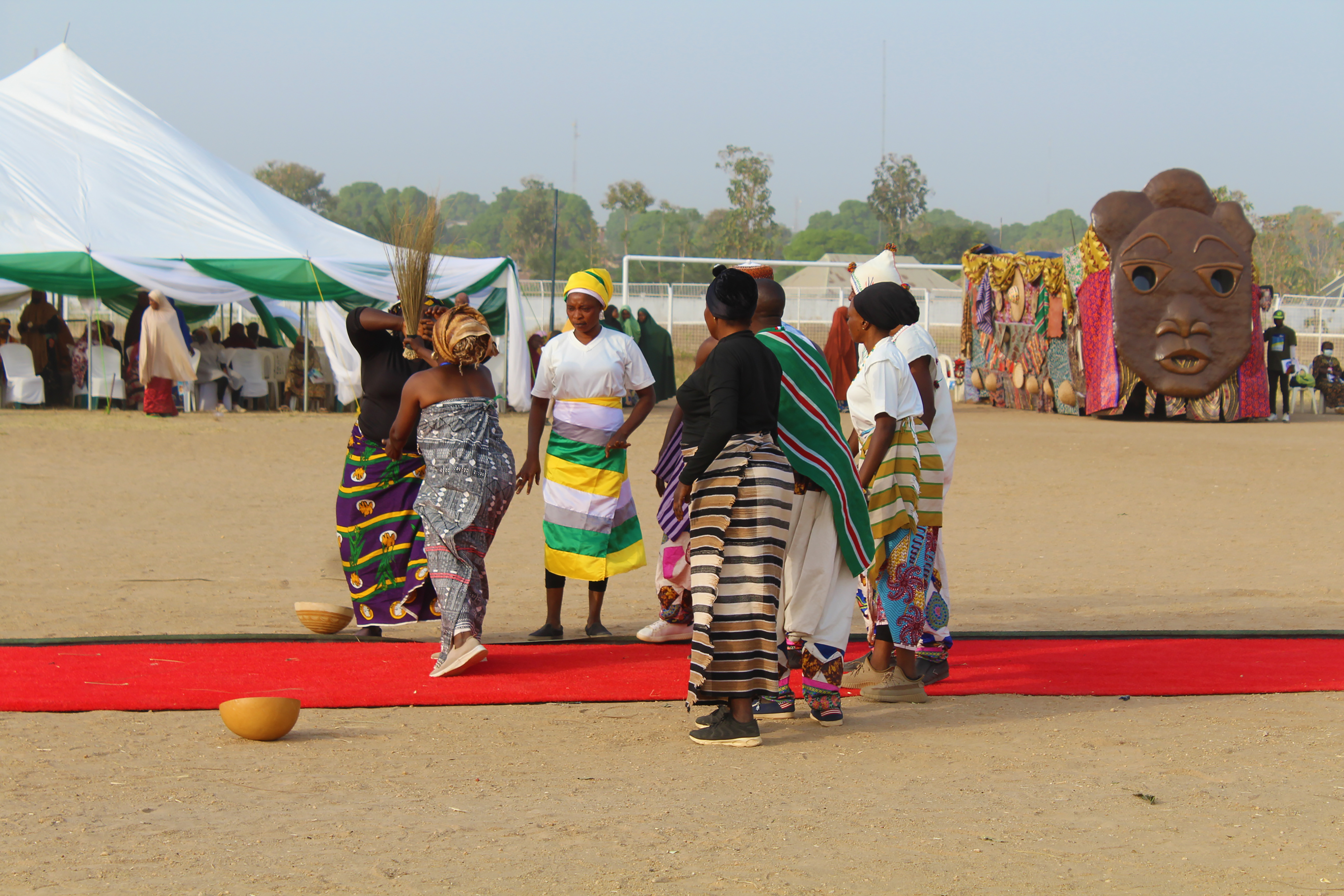
Southern Kaduna people drama at SK Fest 2024

== Economy ==
=== Natural resources ===
In the mid-2000s, former Nigerian Minister of Solid Minerals during the Olusegun Obasanjo regime, Leslie Obiora, compiled a list of minerals across the country, which amounted to a total of 74 minerals; 34 were declared fit for mining on a commercial scale, with Southern Kaduna having over 30 minerals with over fifty percent (50%) of them minable.

In August 2016, the NTA reported the discovery of nickel in the village of Dangoma, a village over 11 km south of Kafanchan, by a private mining network led by an Australian mining veteran, Hugh Morgan. The Australian was said to have reported that the discovered nickel balls which are rumored to have a nickel grade exceeding 90 percent and believed to be a global innovation due to their wide distribution, present an opportunity for generating immediate revenue through a straightforward and cost-effective screening process. This revenue can be utilized to finance a comprehensive evaluation of the discovery, which has sparked excitement within the exploration community. The newspaper added,

"...the discovery is unusual because the nickel is found in small balls up to 3mm in diameter of a high purity in shallow soils in what could be the surface expression of a much bigger hard-rock nickel field."

=== Agriculture ===
==== Ginger ====
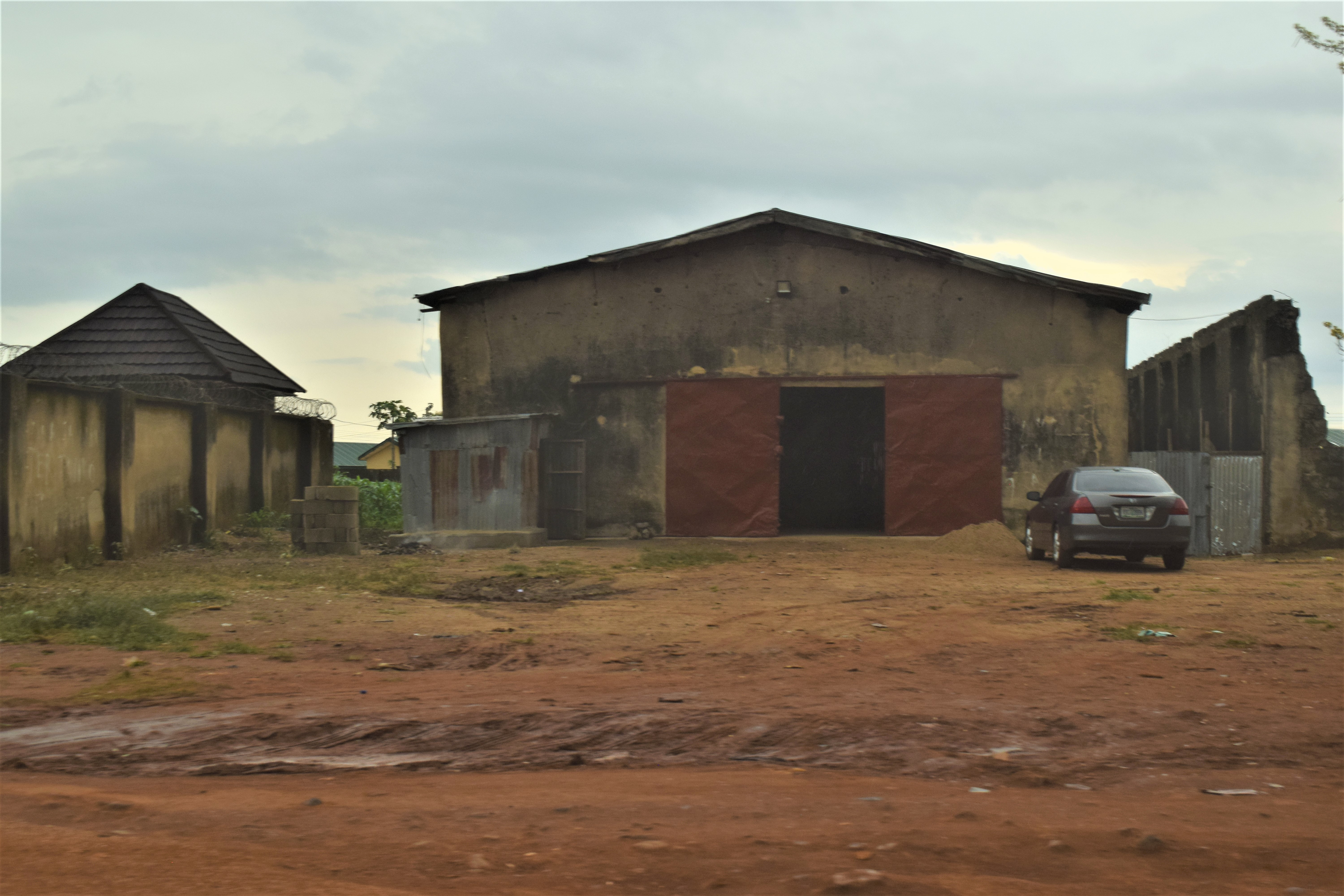
Ginger warehouse Kafanchan

Southern Kaduna is the epicentre of ginger production in Nigeria. In the 1990s, ginger farmers enjoyed profit from the sales of their harvested crops due to the availability of ginger processing companies all over the region. Still, today, most of those companies have shut down without efforts to revive them on the government's side.

A fungal disease outbreak was noticed across many areas in Southern Kaduna in the first week of July 2023. In September 2023, while speaking in Kachia, the president of the National Ginger Association of Nigeria, Nuhu B. Dauda, decried the loss of about 10 billion Naira by the state's economy due to the strange disease that affected the ginger production for the year. A month later, in October, while also speaking on the outbreak of ginger blight, a fungal disease, across seven Local Government Areas of Southern Kaduna, which affected about 2,500 farm hectares, the senator representing Kaduna South Senatorial District, Sunday Marshall Katung, in an interview with Arise News demanded support from the Nigerian federal government and stated that 85% of Nigeria's ginger production was from Kaduna State, largely contributing to making the country the 2nd highest producer of the crop in the world. He added that Nigeria realized about 10 billion Naira from the export of the crop in the 2nd quarter of that year. In May 2024, Daily Trust reported that in addition to the loss of seeds to the outbreak, farmers faced the risk of being kidnapped by kidnappers in their farmlands around Kachia and Kagarko Local Government Areas.

== Education ==
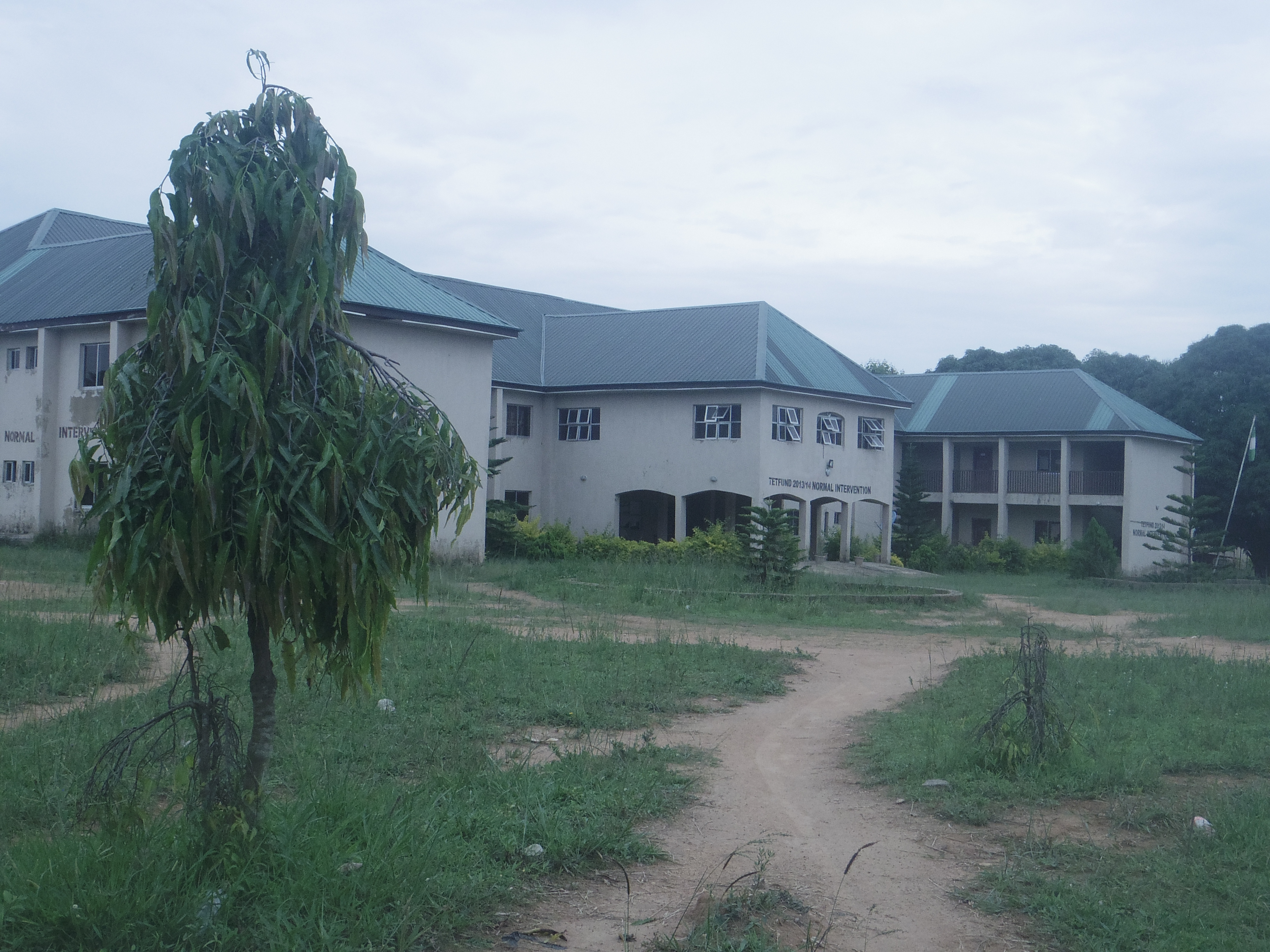
Classroom block, College of Agriculture, Nuhu Bamali Polytechnic, Agut Ntswuo (Samaru Kataf) Campus

It was asserted by Kazah-Toure (1999:130) that Southern Kaduna took a lead in education in the defunct Northern Region, during the period around the Nigerian Civil War (between 1966 and 1970s). Bonat (1989:55) claims that a majority of the educated people from this region who are non-Hausa, were in the teaching profession and in the middle cadre of the civil service in contrast to the Hausa who were dominant at the highest bureaucratic levels.

In March 2024, a group, Kaduna Indigenous Publishers Network spoke of the establishment of the Southern Kaduna Educational and Human Capacity Development Commission, to create access for the youths of the region to good education and training opportunities.

In March 2025, Bishop Matthew Kukah stated that Southern Kaduna is one of the leading regions north of Nigeria, in terms of education with no less than 200 professors who largely benefited from the education brought by the missionaries including himself.

=== Present tertiary institutions ===
==== Federal ====
- Federal University of Applied Sciences Kachia (formerly Nok University Kachia)
- National Open University of Nigeria, Gworok Study Center
- Kaduna Polytechnic, Kaduna

==== State ====
- Kaduna State University, Kaduna and Kafanchan Campuses
- School of Agricultural Technology, Nuhu Bamalli Polytechnic, Agut Ntswuo Campus
- Kaduna State College of Education, Kafanchan

==== Private ====
- Greenfield University, Kaduna

== Politics ==
The Southern Kaduna People's Union (SOKAPU) had been the umbrella socio-cultural body for the about 67 recognized ethnic groups of Southern Kaduna over the decades. The group is currently under the leadership of Samuel Tabara Kato. He succeeded Awemi Dio Maisamari in December 2023 as National President of SOKAPU.

In September 2022, the Southern Kaduna Leadership Council (SKLC) chaired by Ishaya Dary Akau, listed SOKAPU as its member. Other members of the council announced included the Southern Kaduna Elders Consultative Forum, Southern Kaduna Autochthonous Community Development Associations Forum, Forum of Southern Kaduna Professors, Southern Kaduna Christian Leaders Association, Southern Kaduna Retired Military and Para-Military Officers Association, Southern Kaduna Lawyers Forum, Southern Kaduna Leaders Forum, and the Visionaries for the formation of the Council. The listing of the SOKAPU under the SKLC, however, was not popular with some members of the SOKAPU executive as the group was soon plunged into an internal crisis which climaxed with the resignation of Maisamari.

In 2021, while speaking to Guardian Nigeria, the SOKAPU President, Jonathan Asake stated that Southern Kaduna had demanded the creation of Gurara State for over 30 years. He added that the proposed state was among the 18 proposed states in the report of the 2014 Nigerian National Confab conducted during the presidency of Goodluck Jonathan given amending the Nigerian constitution.

== Notable people ==
Among the notable people from Southern Kaduna are:

- Katung Aduwak (b. 1980), winner Big Brother Naija premier edition (2006); film director, screenwriter, producer
- Martin Luther Agwai (b. 1948), Nigerian Chief of Defence Staff (2006–2007); Chief of Army Staff (2003–2006); Commander, UNAMID (2008–2009)
- Gwamna Awan (1915–2008), Agwam Agworok V, one of the rulers with the longest reign in Africa (1945–2008)
- Musa Bityong (194?–1985), one of the first Nigerian Army officers to be airborne qualified, alleged shooter of Nigeria's Military Head-of-state Gen. Johnson Aguiyi-Ironsi and Western Region governor Lt. Col. Adekunle Fajuyi during the 29 July 1966 coup
- Bala Ade Dauke (1931 – 2005), first Indigenous district head in Southern Zaria (excluding the independent Chiefdoms of Jaba, Kagoro, and Moroa)
- Ishaya Iko Ibrahim (1952–2022), Nigeria's 18th Chief of Naval Staff (2008–2010)
- Josiah Tagwai Kantiyok (b. 1968), consultant and chief executive of the Veterinary Council of Nigeria (2009–2020), Agwam Fantswam II (2020–date)
- Abigail Marshall Katung (b. 1973), 1st African Lord mayor of Leeds (2024–2025)
- Sunday Marshall Katung (b. 1961), senator representing Kaduna South senatorial district (2023–date), lawyer
- Matthew Hassan Kukah (b. 1952), Bishop of Roman Catholic Diocese of Sokoto, human rights activist
- Zamani Lekwot (b. 1944), military governor Rivers State (1975–1978), Southern Kaduna elder statesman
- Blessing Liman (b. 1984), Nigeria's 1st female military pilot
- Adamu Audu Maikori (1942–2020), 1st professional lawyer in Southern Kaduna, politician, banker, military pilot
- Audu Maikori (b. 1975), co-founder Chocolate City (record label), lawyer
- Victor Moses (b. 1990), professional footballer
- Christopher Gwabin Musa (b. 1967), Nigeria's 18th Chief of Defence Staff (2023–2025)
- Andrew Jonathan Nok (1962–2017), professor of biochemistry, researcher and winner of the Alexander Humboldt Prize and (2013); discovered the gene responsible for the synthesis of sialidase
- Binta Sukai, Miss Nigeria (1990)
- Patrick Ibrahim Yakowa (1948–2012), 1st Governor of Kaduna State from Southern Kaduna (2010–2012)
- Andrew Laah Yakubu (b. 1955), Group Managing Director of the Nigerian National Petroleum Corporation (2012–2014), engineer
- Luka Nyeh Yusuf (1952–2009), Nigeria's 20th Chief of Army Staff (2007–2008), Chief of Staff of the Armed Forces (Liberia) (2006–2007)

== See also ==
- 1992 Zangon Kataf crises
- 2019 Kaduna State massacre
- Afan National Festival
- Kafanchan Peace Declaration
- Kajuru Castle
- List of villages in Kaduna State
- Matsirga waterfalls
- Nok culture
- Railway stations in Nigeria
- Southern Kaduna Crisis
- Mass killings in Southern Kaduna

== Bibliography ==
- Abah, Ikwue; Okoye-Ugwu, Stella (2002). "The Cultural Dynamics of Power and Patriarchy: A Study of Idoma-Alekwu Oral Epic" (PDF). IKENGA International Journal of Institute of African Studies UNN. 20 (1): 173–180.
- Achi, B. (2005). "Local History in Post-Independent Africa". Writing African History. University Rochester Press. pp. 374–403. ISBN 9781580462563.
- Achi, B.; Bitiyonɡ, Y. A.; Bunɡwon, A. D.; Baba, M. Y.; Jim, L. K. N.; Kazah-Toure, M.; Philips, J. E. (2019). A Short History of the Atyap. Tamaza Publishinɡ Co. Ltd., Zaria. pp. 9–245. ISBN 978-978-54678-5-7.
- Afolayan, Funso (2005). "Benue Valley Peoples: Jukun and Kwarafa". In Kevin Shillington (ed.). Encyclopedia of African History. Fitzroy Dearborn. pp. 247–249. ISBN 978-1-57958-245-6.
- Gadzama, Austin (2014). The Exquisite Ham Heritage. Zaria: Ahmadu Bello University Press Limited. pp. 1–248. ISBN 978-978-125-546-5.
- Lugard, F. D. (1904). "Northern Nigeria". The Geographical Journal. 23 (1): 1–27. Bibcode:1904GeogJ..23....1L. doi:10.2307/1775735. JSTOR 1775735.
- Mallam, Ibrahim (2023). "British Destruction of Sylvan and Cash Crop Industries in Southern Kaduna-Nigeria, 1900-1960". NIU Journal of Social Sciences, Nexus International University. 9 (4): 89–100. doi:10.58709/niujss.v9i4.1761. ISSN 3007-1682.
- "The Kano Chronicle". Royal Anthropological Institute of Great Britain and Ireland. 38–39. Translated by Palmer, H.R. London: 58–97. 1908. JSTOR 2843130.
- Tambo, David (1978). "The "Hill Refuges" of the Jos Plateau: A Historiographical Examination". History in Africa. 5: 201–223. doi:10.2307/3171487. JSTOR 3171487.
