= Bala Ade Dauke =

Agwatyap I

- Agwatyap I
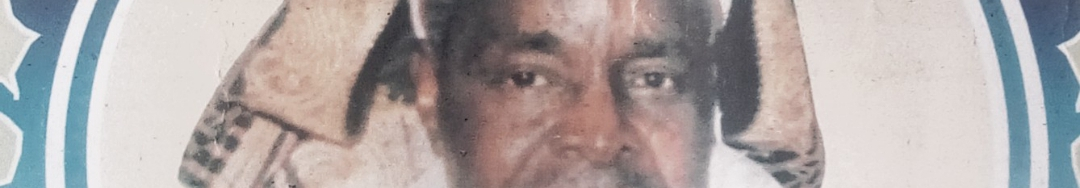
- Cropped image of Agwatyap 1 B.A. Dauke

Paramount ruler of Atyap Chiefdom
- In office: May 1996 – 1 January 2005
- Successor: Agwam (Engr. Dr.) Harrison Bungwon FNSE, Agwatyap II

District Head of Zangon Kataf and Kuyan Banan Zazzau
- In office: 1967 – 1996
- Predecessor: Sarkin Yaki Yahaya Pate (1961-1967)
- Successor: Muhammadu Balarabe (1996- )
- Born: 4 January 1931; Gan, Kanai, Northern Region, British Nigeria
- Died: 1 January 2005 (aged 73)
- Spouse: Ladi (m. 1952)
- Issue: Elias Usman and Musa
Names
- English: Bala Ade Dauke Gora; Tyap: Bala Ade Daukee Gora
- House: Agbaat
- Father: Ade Gora
- Mother: Akut
- Religion: Evangelical Christianity
- Occupation: Policeman, Social welfarist, Politician

Styles of Agwatyap I
- Reference style: His Royal Highness
- Spoken style: Your Royal Highness
- Alternative style: Tyap: Agwam (King)

Bala Ade Dauke Gora (4 January 1931 – 1 January 2005) was the first indigenous District Head in Southern Zaria and first paramount ruler of the Atyap Chiefdom, a Nigerian traditional state in southern Kaduna State, Middle Belt (central) Nigeria. He was known by the titles Kuyan Banan Zazzau and Agwatyab I.

== Early life and education ==
Bala grew up seeing his father, Ade, and his father's elder brother, Dauke, living together in a large compound and farming together in Gan, Kanai (H. Gora), Atyapland. His uncle was the Family Head (A̱tyoli) as well as Village Head (T. A̱gwam A̱keang, H. Dagachi) of Kanai (H. Gora), acting in the capacity of an administrator in the area, answerable to the District Head at the Administrative Headquarters in Zangon Kataf town. Bala's exact date of birth is unknown; he earlier predicted his birth year to be between 1935 and 1936 in his autobiography captured in the book he wrote titled, Zangon Kataf: A Journey of a People. However, it is inscribed on his tomb that he was born on 4 January 1931.

Bala's education career began in 1942, when he was enrolled by his uncle, Dauke, who loved him greatly into the Native Authority (NA) primary school, Zonzon, which he attended alongside Dauke's son, Bako, his beloved cousin, before the latter was dropped after attaining Primary three due to his age. Bako earlier taught Bala ABCD alongside other boys in the house, being one of the first students Zonzon NA primary school, second to be established in Atyapland in 1939, and much older than Bala. Between 1943 and 1946 he held the position of the school's Health Prefect,

In 1946, he was admitted into the Zaria Middle School – now Alhudahuda College (where he remained until 1951) and in the same year, lost his uncle, Dauke. His first visit to the school was in 1944, when his teacher, Dawa Jankasa, took him alongside a friend, Adam Atar, on an exposure mission. He became a long-distance runner in "Waziri House" and won the school house and himself medals. He also became a school Time Keeper and a Junior Prefect in his second year in 1947.

== Working career and higher education ==
After leaving the Zaria Middle School in early 1951, Dauke immediately applied to join the Nigeria Police Force. While awaiting the result, he got a job at the Sudan Interior Mission (SIM) Bookshop, Jos. Later that year, his application to join the police was successful and got enrolled into the Police College, Kaduna, and after passing out got his first posting to the Kaduna Junction as a patrolman, his second posting was to the Kaduna roundabout in 1952.

He enrolled for a Fresher's course in Kano to last between 1952 and 1953, but due to the Kano Riot of 1953, could not finish the 6-month course as he got posted to the crisis scene in Fage, Kano. Later on, he became a police station writer and then was moved to the Criminal Investigation Department.

Dauke's first assignment was to bring back a criminal suspect from Lagos, who unfortunately escaped in his custody on the way back to Kaduna in Offa in August ending of 1955, which got him into a mess.

He left the Nigeria Police Force in February 1956 and returned home to Gan, Kanai, alongside his wife, Ladi, who soon became the first seamstress in Atyapland.

In 1958, Dauke was admitted into the Institute of Administration, Ahmadu Bello University, Zaria, for a six-month Secretarial Studies program, which he concluded in 1959.

In January 1960, he was again admitted for a one-year Clerical course in the same Institute of Administration, which after concluding, got transferred to the Emir's palace in Zaria (from Zangon Kataf) as a Clerical assistant.

In the last quarter of 1961, he was made the Native Authority's Social Welfare Officer, and remained so till 1963, when he attended the Northern Region Social Welfare Officer's course in Kaduna and came fourth from 14 overall. This, thus, won him an automatic scholarship to go to Coleg Harlech, North Wales, United Kingdom, to study Psychology and Economics at advanced level. On reaching there, he was sent to East London College of Commerce for remedial studies, where he also enrolled into a part-time course in Social Welfare. In 1965, he returned to Coleg Harlech from the London School of Economics to read sociology.

In 1966, he returned home after the expiry of his scholarship and reapplied for another scholarship to conclude his studies, and it was approved. He was to travel back on 29 April 1967, when he was forced into accepting the position of District Head (or Hakimi) on 4 April 1967, and began acting in that capacity on 6 April 1967.

== Personal life ==
In 1948, Dauke got to meet with Ladi, a pen-friend he got to know in Zaria Middle School through his friend, Adam Atar, for the very first time in Ashong Ashyui on a market day. She also happened to be a cousin to Tagwai Sambo, another schoolmate of his and friend. He paid an introductory visit to her parents in Manchok in 1950 and married her by proxy, represented by a relative of his, Bawa, on 8 July 1952.

== Political career and kingship ==
Dauke began the move towards politics after leaving the Nigeria Police Force, in the later part of 1956, due to his keen interest in the social, economic and political developments of his people, the Atyab and the entire Southern Zaria, and got so close to politicians like Honourable Dauda Haruna from Kwoi, then representing Southern Zaria in the [Northern Nigeria] House of Assembly, Kaduna, and also met others like Solomon Lar, Reverend David Lot and Tanko Yusufu.

In 1957, he became the scribe for the Atyab Village Group Council, with Adam Yabiliyok as Wakili.

In 1959, he joined the Northern People's Congress (NPC) after the space for the United Middle Belt Congress (UMBC) was filled, in order to participate in the election for a seat in the Northern Region House of Representatives in Kaduna, for the Zangon Katab constituency, but lost to another Atyap (Katab/Kataf) man, Hon. Shekarau Kaah, who happened to be the UMBC candidate.

On 4 April 1967, Bala Ade Dauke Gora, was appointed as the first indigenous District Head of Zangon Katab and the whole of Southern Zaria after the rejection of John Sarki Tafida (the Dan Galadima Zazzau and first Christian District Head of Zangon Katab from May 1957 to 1961), who was considered non-indigenous and thus, unqualified for the position by the Southern Zaria elites due to his Hausa-Fulani origins and roots in the Zaria Native Authority. On Wednesday 6 April 1967, he was accompanied by a convoy from Zaria and was driven in the Iyan Zazzau's car alongside friends Bawa Gambo – the Sarkin Zanan Zazzau and Shehu Idris – the then Zaria Emirate secretary, driving through Kaduna, Zonkwa and Zangon Kataf where many were awaiting to welcome him with joy and celebration. That was the day he resumed work and when his Acting appointment expired on 28 September, he fully assumed the position of a District Head after his coronation on 1 October 1967 in which he was made to pick a Zaria royal title and he chose Kuyan Banan Zazzau.

His appointment was not only seen as a means of compensation for his lost bid for a seat in the Northern Region House of Representatives in Kaduna but, also most importantly, to quell the decades-long agitations by the Atyap people for self-autonomy. He had the longest reign as District Head of Zangon Kataf and Kuyan Banan Zazzau for 28 years (1967-1995) when the Atyap people alongside the Bajju, Gwong and Sanga were formally removed from the Zazzau (Zaria) Emirate Council by the Kaduna State government military government of Lawal Jafaru Isa, then in power and the long overdue Atyap Chiefdom was created. Dauke thereupon became the Agwatyab or Agwatyap (Chief of the Atyap), the first indigenous of them all.

Among his achievements as a District Head, Dauke in 1975 assisted the Chawai (Tsam) in realising a district and in 1990, the Bajju and by 1991, achieved the creation of more districts for Zangon Kataf.

In 2001, Dauke as Agwatyab I of Atyabland was upgraded to a Second Class Chief.

== State detention ==
Following the 1992 Zangon Kataf crises of 6 February and 15 and 16 May at least 21 indigenous Atyap people were arrested and left in detention without charge or trial under Decree 2 of 1984 enacted by the Nigerian military government. Bala Ade Dauke's arrest came on 21 May 1992 and on was later grouped alongside five others namely: Maj. Gen. Zamani Lekwot (rtd.), ACP Juri Babang Ayok (rtd.), Major John Atomic Kude (rtd.), Dominic G. Yahaya (the present Atyatyap), and Peter Lekwot, as "Special Class" prisoners. He remained a prisoner between 21 May 1992 to 9 October 1993 when he finally got his freedom.

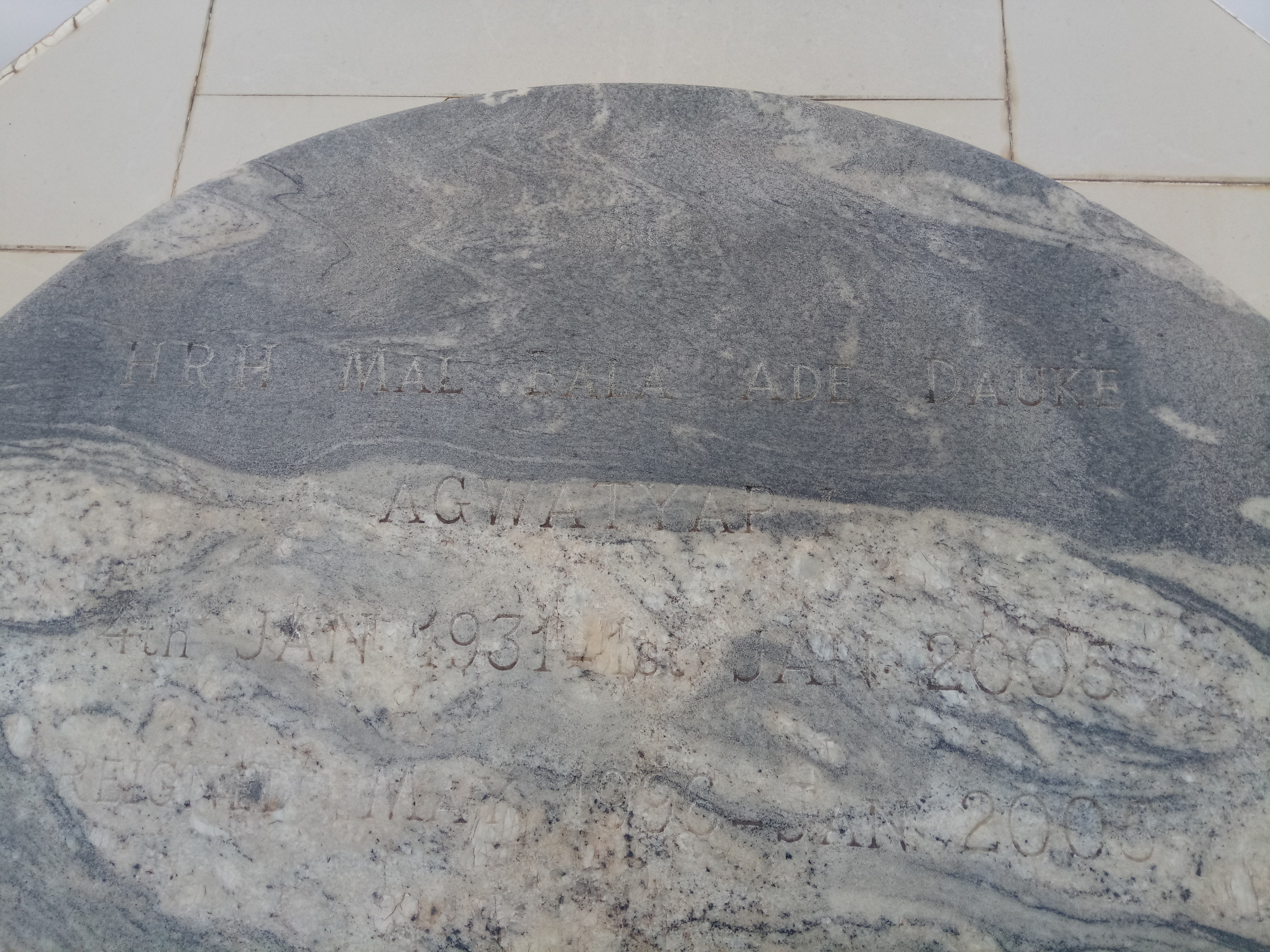
Tombstone, Agwam B. A. Dauke.

Bala Ade Dauke Agbaat royal house Born: 4 January 1931 Died: 1 January 2005
Regnal titles
| Preceded by Title established | Agwatyap; 1996–2005 | Succeeded by Harrison Bungwon |
