= Bala Achi =

Nigerian historian and writer

- Born: Bala Achi; 2 December 1956; Zonzon, Kaduna State, Nigeria
- Died: 5 April 2005 (aged 48); Abuja, Nigeria
- Education: Ahmadu Bello University (ABU), Zaria
- Occupations: Historian, Academician, Writer, Researcher
- Spouse: Rhoda Achi
- Children: Nevan, Biliyok and Bila
- Writing career
- Notable work: A Short History of Atyap (2019)

Bala Achi (2 December 1956 – 5 April 2005) was a renowned Nigerian historian, writer and academic.

== Early life and education ==
Bala Achi was born into the family of Achi Kanan and Zuciya Achi on 2 December 1956. He was the third child of the family.

He began his educational career at LEA Primary School, Zonzon, Zangon Kataf LGA where he held the position of Headboy (1968-1969), from whence he proceeded to St. John's College (later called Rimi College), in Kaduna after obtaining a First School Leaving Certificate in 1969, for his secondary school education, where he also was President of the Fellowship of Christian Students (FCS) from 1973 till his graduation with a West African School Certificate (WASC) in 1974. Afterwards, he got admitted into the College of Arts and Sciences (CAS), in Zaria and after completing that first A-level hurdle with an Independent Joint Matriculation Board (IJMB) Certificate in 1976, advanced for a degree in Ahmadu Bello University (ABU) Zaria, where he became the Secretary-General, Kaduna State Students Union (1977-1978) and graduated with a Bachelor of Arts, B.A. (Hons.) in 1979 and subsequently obtained Post-graduate Diploma in Education in 1982 and a Master's degree in History in 1985, both from the same institution, including a Doctorate degree in History which he was not able to complete due to a received call to service which left him with an undefended thesis.

== Working career ==
Achi served under the National Youth Service Corps as a teacher at St. Patrick's College, Asaba, Bendel State (now capital of Delta State) (1979-1980) after completing his bachelor's degree programme. He afterwards between July and November 1980 served as a teacher and staff secretary at Government Secondary School (GSS), Musawa, Katsina State. He later got employed as Graduate Assistant in All Teacher's College (ATC)/Ahmadu Bello University (ABU), his alma mater, where he lectured from (December 1980 to September 1983), as Assistant Lecturer, (October 1983 to September 1984), Lecturer II (October 1984 to December 1988) and Lecturer I (October 1989 to December 1991) when he was studying for a doctorate degree in which he was working on military history for his Ph.D. but left the university before he could complete the program to become the first Head of Station (Chief Research Officer) of the National Commission of Museums and Monuments, Abuja, Nigeria (December 1991 to January 1998). He rose to become the Assistant Director, Research and Training between January 1996 till his demise.

== Academic publications ==
Achi had several academic publications and contributed to scholarly journals, amongst which are:

- Military Technoloɡy, Population Growth and City Wallet: The Case of Kano, 1200-1825 AD. History Research at ABU, Vol. VII, 1983; pp. 1–19.
- House Traditional Architecture: The Wall of Kano and Zaria. Nigeria Magazine, Vol. 53, No. 3, 1985; pp. 1–3.
- Culture and Education: The Role Archeology Can Play in Promoting Cultural Awareness in Nigeria Schools. West African Journal of Archeology, Special Edition, 1982; pp. 60–63.
- The Gandu System in the Economy of Pre-colonial Hausaland. Nigeria Magazine, Vol. 57, 3 & 4 Nov. 1989; pp. 19–55.
- Arms and Armor in the Warfare of Pre-colonial Hausaland. African Study Monographs, Vol. 8, No. 3, 1985; pp. 143–54.
- Biologically Based Warfare in Pre-colonial Nigeria: Science and Technology in African History with Case Studies from Nigeria, Sierra Leone, Zimbabwe and Zambia. Edwin Mallers Press, New York, (Ed.) by Gloria T. Emessgwall, 1992; pp. 23–32.
- Military Technology in Nigeria before 1900. Historical Foundation of Science and Technology in Nigeria, (Ed.) Gloria T. Emessgwall, 1993, USA; pp. 125–136.
- Warfare and Military Architecture Among the Atyap.
- Engineering in Pre-colonial Nigeria: The Construction Fortifications, African Systems of Science, Technology and Art. The Nigerian Experience, Karnak Publishers, London, 1993; pp. 115–124.
- Construction Techniques in African Encyclopaedia of the History of Science, Technology and Medication in Non-Western Cultures. Kluwer Academic Publishers, Netherlands, 1997; pp. 232–5.
- Local History in Post-Independent Africa, Writing African History
- History of Mathematics in Africa: 1986-1999.
- Encyclopedia of the History of Medicine in Non-Western Cultures.
- Pre-colonial Economic History of Nigeria

He started work on the autobiography of Major-Gen. Zamani Lekwot (rtd.), MNI. However, he died in 2005 before he could complete the work.

Also, as at the time of his demise, he had about three projects he left uncompleted:

- Heritaɡe of Kano: 1,000 Years of Leɡacy. A project involvinɡ exhibition, durbar, tours and seminars.
- Abuja: History of Federal Capital.

The latest publication in his name, involvinɡ the third parts of his uncompleted projects, is the book titled: A Short History of the Atyap, an 11 chapter, 261 paged book reportedly published posthumously in honor of his memory as an excellent scholarly writer and passionate Atyap man. They canvassed for a fair deal for his people and all ethnic minorities. The book was launched in Abuja, the Nigerian capital, and was well attended by dignitaries, including the former Group Managing Director of the Nigerian National Petroleum Corporation (NNPC), Engr. Andrew Laah Yakubu, co-writers such as Prof. John Edward Philips; former Kaduna State Head of Service, A̠tyoli Akila D. Bungwon; the A̠gwatyap A̠gwam Dominic G. Yahaya (KSM); and the book reviewer, Rev. Fr. William Abbah; amongst others. Another late contributor was Toure Kazah-Toure.
