= Mashan, Nigeria =

Mashan
- Village
- Location within Nigeria
- Coordinates: 09°50′33″N 08°20′47″E
- Country: Nigeria
- State: Kaduna State
- LGA: Zangon Kataf
- District: Zonzon
- Time zone: UTC+01:00 (WAT)
- 6-digit numeric: 802138
- Climate: Aw

Mashan is a village situated within the Atyap Chiefdom in Zonzon (Zonzon) district at Zangon Kataf Local Government Area Kaduna State, Nigeria. It is a part of the Fantswamland region that reflects the history and the traditions of the Fantswam people. There is a Universal Basic Education (UBE) Primary School located in Mashan, Zangon Kataf which indicates the presence of basic educational infrastructure.

== Geography and Location ==
Mashan is located in the southern part of Kaduna State. With geographic coordinates of 09°50′33″N 08°20′47″E and a postal code, 802138, which falls under the Zonzon district.

== Historical Significance ==
Màshan has a history of settlement by various communities, including the Fantswam people before they reached Kafanchan. The migration of Fantswam people to Mashan reflects their search for a more favourable environment.

== Cultural Significance ==
Mashan is part of the Fantswam people's history and cultural heritage. The Fantswam people's experience in Mashan contributed to their transition from a nomadic lifestyle to a stable, rooted society.

== Nearby settlement ==
Mashan is surrounded by several nearby villages and towns, including Zonzon, Wawa-rafi, U/Tabo, Sakum, Mawokili, Matyei,Runji and Mabuhu, all of which share the same postal code. These neighbouring communities are an integral part of the region's cultural and geographical landscape.

== See also ==
- List of villages in Kaduna State
