= Atyap Community Development Association =

Organisation for the Atyap people in Nigeria

- Abbreviation: ACDA
- Founded: 4 October 1989; 36 years ago
- Founded at: Mawukili, Zangon Kataf, Kaduna State, Nigeria
- Headquarters: Mawukili, Zangon Kataf, Kaduna State, Nigeria
- Region served: Atyap Chiefdom, Southern Kaduna
- Official language: English, Tyap
- President: Samuel Timbuwak Achie

The Atyap Community Development Association (ACDA), is a sociocultural organisation established to promote the interests of the Atyap people of Southern Kaduna, Nigeria. The organization, earlier known as the "Kataf Youth Development Association" (KYDA) was established in 1989, but later renamed in 2010 to its present name.

== Origin ==
According to the National President, Dr. Samuel Achie, in 2023, the organisation was registered as a corporate entity in Nigeria on October 4, 1989, as the Kataf Youth Development Association (KYDA) with the license number 5562. It later got registered again with the Corporate Affairs Commission, Abuja, on January 27, 2010, when the name got changed to the Atyap Community Development Association with the license number CAC/11/No 36929. The ACDA is branched across the 36 states of Nigeria and the FCT, and even beyond the country.

== Campaigns ==
The ACDA leadership reportedly challenged the indiscriminate killings of Atyap people by Fulani terrorists on multiple occasions.

On July 16, 2020, the leadership of the ACDA convened at the NUJ Secretariat, Kaduna, to condemn a statement by the Kaduna State Governor, Nasir el-Rufai, to inaugurate another committee of enquiry into the 1992 Zangon Kataf crises, which according to the ACDA, had already been taken care of. This statement was signed by the organisation's Secretary-General, Sule Tinat Bodam.

Four days later, on July 20, the Zangon Urban Development Association (ZUDA) issued a response to the press briefing earlier made by the ACDA, responding to the issues raised by the Kaduna State Government, in a statement released on June 29, 2020. The statement was on the inauguration of a white paper committee to review the reports of the Judicial Commission of Enquiry on the 1992 Zangon Kataf crises and the AVM Usman Muazu Reconciliation Committee Report, including other matters arising.

In a report signed on March 8, 2021, by the ACDA National President, Silas Adamu, accused certain residents in the Zangon Urban Ward of providing hideouts for killer bandits terrorizing Atyapland (which the Zangon Urban Development Association (ZUDA) would later deny through its National chairman, Shehu Abdullahi.). This news was published by Nigerian news media few hours before Adamu would lose his life in a motor crash along the Kaduna-Abuja highway together with his wife, Mercy, and daughter, Joyce Kubai. Adamu was also the Secretary-General of the Medical and Health Workers Union of Nigeria.

In July 2021, the ACDA led by Samuel Achie, its new National President who succeeded Adamu, while speaking during a press conference at the Nigeria Union of Journalists Secretariat in Kaduna, threatened to take legal actions on the killings of the people of the Atyap people of Zangon Kataf.

On March 15, 2023, following an attack by bandits which killed 10 and injured four Atyap youths, Achie stated that the military stopped the youths from repelling the attackers, adding that the killings were done under their watch.

=== World press conference ===
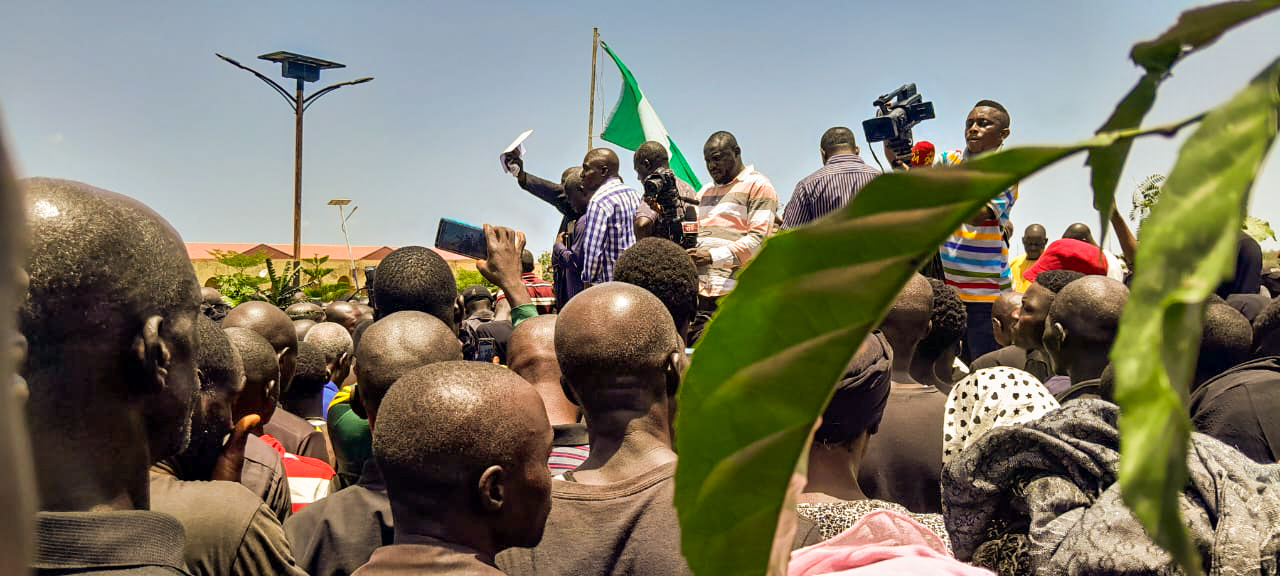
Achie speaking during the World Press Conference organized by the ACDA at Chenkwon on May 1, 2023

On May 1, 2023, the ACDA organized a World Press Conference and protest at Chenkwon to enlighten the global community about the situation in Atyapland. According to the leader of the ACDA, Dr. Samuel Achie, not less than 518 people lost their lives in several attacks by the armed herdsmen within five years in Zangon Kataf Local Government Area. About 20 communities and thousands and of people were said to have been displaced. The ACDA laid accusation also, on the soldiers sent of being biased in their execution of duty. The leader also pledged resistance against the unnecessary killings of the people of Atyapland, and sought for the removal of Timothy Opurum, the sector commander of Operation Safe Haven, with immediate effect for his false narratives about the ongoing murders. Achi declared that if any attacks are witnessed again, Atyapland and the rest of Zangon Kataf LGA would be an unreachable ground for cattle.

Two prominent indigenes of the area, Lawrencia Mallam, a former Nigerian Minister of Environment, and Danladi Kwasu, a member of the Kaduna State House of Assembly, both believed the current challenge was a result insincerity and the lack of the will by government and security agencies to end it. The incoming Kaduna State administration was tasked by the ACDA to work on the security issues and restore Atyapland and other areas of the state affected by the killings. Later in month, the Nigerian Army, through the Director, Defence Media Operations, Major-General Musa Danmadami, issued a response to the report on Brigadier-General Opurum, saying it was investigating the matter.

On March 2, the number of protesters increased. A larger crowd was seen along the 12 km stretch between the Zangon Kataf LGA Secretariat at Zonkwa where the protest was held, and Chenkwon, where the protest was held the day before. At the secretariat, the Chairman of the Local Government Area, Francis Sani Zimbo, stated that much funds had been spent from the treasury to cushion the effects of the attacks on the people, which seem not to be ending.

== Proscription ==
On 28 May 2023, few hours before leaving office, the Governor of Kaduna State, Nasir el-Rufai, through his spokesman, Muyiwa Adekeye, issued a proscription order against the ACDA. The reason given was that the ACDA was a threat to the "peace, tranquility, harmonious coexistence and good governance of Kaduna State". The order, backdated to take effect from May 24, 2024, was said to be an invocation of the Section 60 of the Kaduna State Penal Code Law No. 5 of 2017, and Section 5 (2) of the 1999 Constitution of the Federal Republic of Nigeria, according to the statement. The ACDA President, however, said the act is a violation of the Freedom of Association, adding that the decision would be challenged in court. Achie also described the proscription as illegal, immoral and oppressive.

In June 2023, a Nigerian journalist and blogger, Steven Kefas, once imprisoned by the ex-Governor of Kaduna State, Nasir el-Rufai, writes:

"Apparently, Ex Kaduna Governor El-Rufai proscribed the Atyap Community Development Association an indigenous sociocultural organization BECAUSE the group viewed to resist the attempt by the governor to forcefully take their ancestral land and give it to Hausa and Fulani settlers in Zangon Kataf..."

Upon the appointment of the Chief of Defence Staff, Major-General Christopher Gwabin Musa, a native of Atyapland in June 2023, the ACDA through its National President, Dr. Samuel T. Achie, expressed optimism with regards to the security situation in the country.

== Leadership ==
Within its hierarchy, the leaders of the ACDA are called National President, President Worldwide, or simply, President. The following is a list of ACDA leaders:

- Elias Kambai
- Danjuma Karau (2011)
- Francis Kanwai Dogara Baita (2012 - ?2013)
- Lucius Joseph Bamaiyi ( - 2021)
- Silas Tsuu Adamu (Jan. 9, 2021 - Mar. 8, 2021)
- Samuel Timbuwak Achie (2021 - date)
