= Mazaki =

Rural settlement in Nigeria

Mazaki Gidan Zaki
- Rural
- Location within Nigeria
- Coordinates: 09°52′N 08°25′E
- Country: Nigeria
- State: Kaduna State
- LGA: Zangon Kataf
- District: Mazaki
- Time zone: UTC+01:00 (WAT)
- Climate: Aw

Mazaki (Hausa: Gidan Zaki), is a village community and district in Zangon Kataf Local Government Area, southern Kaduna state in the Middle Belt region of Nigeria. The postal code for the village is 802140

== Security ==
Mazaki, in recent years has been affected by the ongoing insecurity challenges in southern part of Kaduna, which have includes attacks by armed bandits and ethnic violence. A district head of Mazaki, Haruna Kuye, in November 2020, was killed together with his son, Destiny, in there residence by gunmen. Also 2021, there was an attempted attacked in this same community Mazaki.

== See also ==
- Atyap chiefdom
- Jei District
- Kanai, Nigeria
- List of villages in Kaduna State
