= Manyii-Aghyui =

Manyii-Aghyui Ma̱nyii-A̠ghyui Bakin Kogi, Bakin Kogi Kazare
- Village
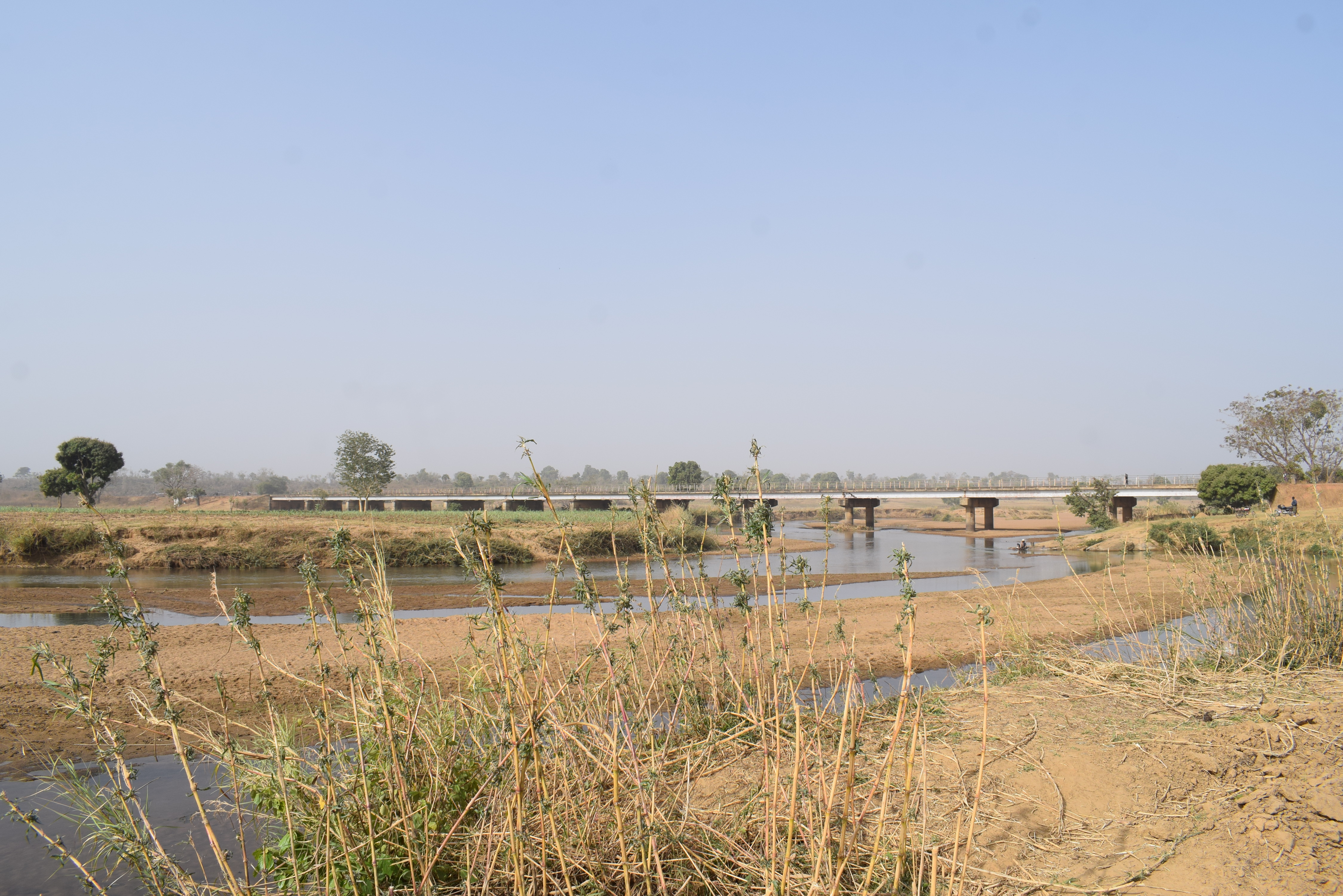
- Kaduna River bridge at Manyii-Aghyui

- Location within Nigeria
- Coordinates: 09°54′33″N 08°25′10″E
- Country: Nigeria
- State: Kaduna State
- LGA: Zangon Kataf
- District: Zonzon
- Time zone: UTC+01:00 (WAT)
- Climate: Aw

Manyii-Aghyui (Manyi-Aghyui, Tyap: Ma̱nyii-A̠ghyui, Hausa: Bakin Kogi) is a village community in Zonzon District of Zangon Kataf Local Government Area, southern Kaduna state in the Middle Belt region of Nigeria. The postal code for the village is 802140.

The area has an altitude of about 2,509 feet or 764 meters. The nearest airport to the community is the Yakubu Gowon Airport, Jos, located 50nm E.

== Climate condition ==
The weather in Bakin Kogi is relatively temperate during the day and cold at night.

The temperatures are from 22 to, 29°C.

== See also ==
- Atyap chiefdom
- List of villages in Kaduna State
