= Magwafan =

Magwafan Bakin Kogi
- Rural
- Location within Nigeria
- Coordinates: 09°54′N 08°25′E
- Country: Nigeria
- State: Kaduna State
- LGA: Zangon Kataf
- District: Kanai, Nigeria
- Time zone: UTC+01:00 (WAT)
- Climate: Aw

Magwafan (Hausa: Bakin Kogi,) is a Rural community in Kanai District of Zangon Kataf Local Government Area, southern Kaduna state in the Middle Belt region of Nigeria. The postal code for the village is :802147 Magwafan is shares two postal code; (Magwafan, Unguwan Rohogo in Zangon Kataf, Kaduna:802147 and Magwafan, Manyi Aghui in Zangon Kataf, Kaduna:802132.

== Development ==
There's an ongoing bridge construction in the Magwafan river, the stretch of the bridge began from Magwafan (Bakin Kogi Kazare), Ataghui and the others neighbouring villages and linking over 20 vulnerable communities bordering the Kauru and Kachia Local Government Areas respectively. The bridge construction is at the instance of the lawmaker who is determined to bring succor to communities that were victims of constant attacks from suspected Fulani herdsmen.

== See also ==
- List of villages in Kaduna State
- Kanai, Nigeria
