= Mawukili =

Mawukili Ungwar Wakili
- Village
- Location within Nigeria
- Coordinates: 09°49′N 08°24′E
- Country: Nigeria
- State: Kaduna State
- LGA: Zangon Kataf
- District: Zonzon
- Time zone: UTC+01:00 (WAT)
- Area code: 6FXCR4CP+2X
- Climate: Aw

Mawukili (H.: Ungwan Wakili), is a large village community in Zonzon district, Zangon Kataf Local Government Area, southern Kaduna state in the Middle Belt region of Nigeria. Mawukili is the center of the Atyap Community Development Association (ACDA) in the Atyap community. The postal code for the village is 802130.
