= Dominic Yahaya =

Agwatyap III

Dominic Gambo Yahaya
- Agwatyap III
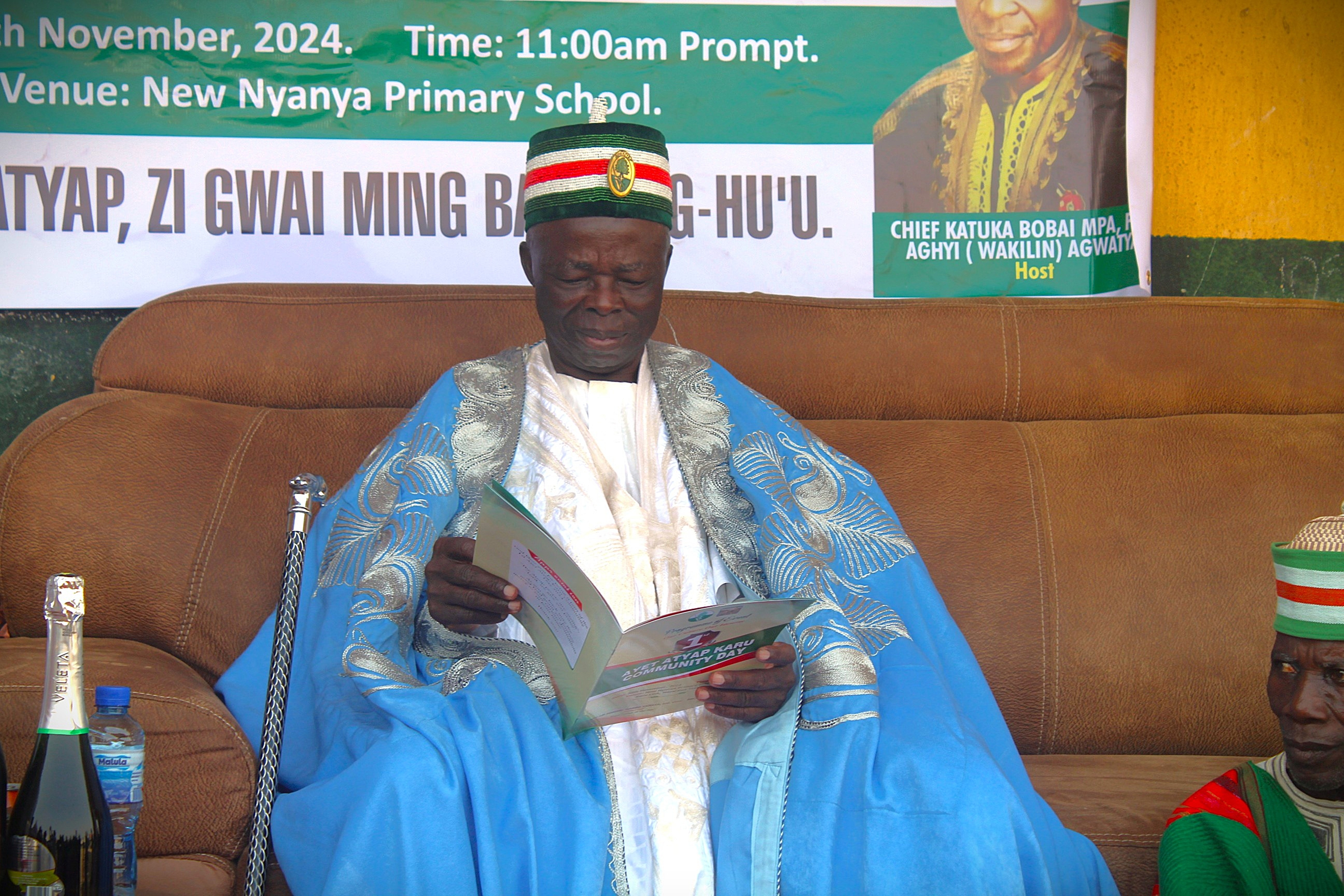
- Agwatyap at Ayet Atyap Karu in November 2024

Monarch of Atyap Chiefdom
- In office: November 12, 2016 – date
- Coronation: November 12, 2016
- Predecessor: Agwam (Engr. Dr.) Harrison Yusuf Bungwon FNSE, Agwatyap II
- Born: 10 January 1950 (age 76); Taligan, Northern Region, British Nigeria
- Spouse: Justina Yahaya (m. 1979)
Names
- English: Dominic Gambo Yahaya
- House: Aminyam
- Religion: Catholicism
- Occupation: Civil servant, Politician

Dominic Gambo Yahaya (born January 10, 1950) is the current paramount ruler of the Atyap Chiefdom, a Nigerian traditional state in southern Kaduna State, Nigeria. He is known by the title Agwatyap III.

== Early life and education ==
Yahaya was born in Taligan, Atyapland, in the defunct Northern Region, British Nigeria (now southern Kaduna State, Nigeria) on 10 January 1950.

He began his education in 1958, attending St. Pius' (now LEA) Primary School, Taligan (Magamia) between 1958 and 1964; St. Mary's (now Government) Secondary School, Fadan Kaje between 1965 and 1969; Barewa College, Zaria between 1970 and 1971. He then proceeded for an advanced level education at Ahmadu Bello University, Zaria between 1972 and 1975, where he graduated with a B.Sc. (Hon.), Second Class Upper Division in Geography and between 1977 and 1979, obtained an M.Sc. in Urban and Regional Planning from the same institution. He has also attended several courses, workshops and seminars at home in Nigeria and overseas.

Yahaya married Miss Justina on November 30, 1979.

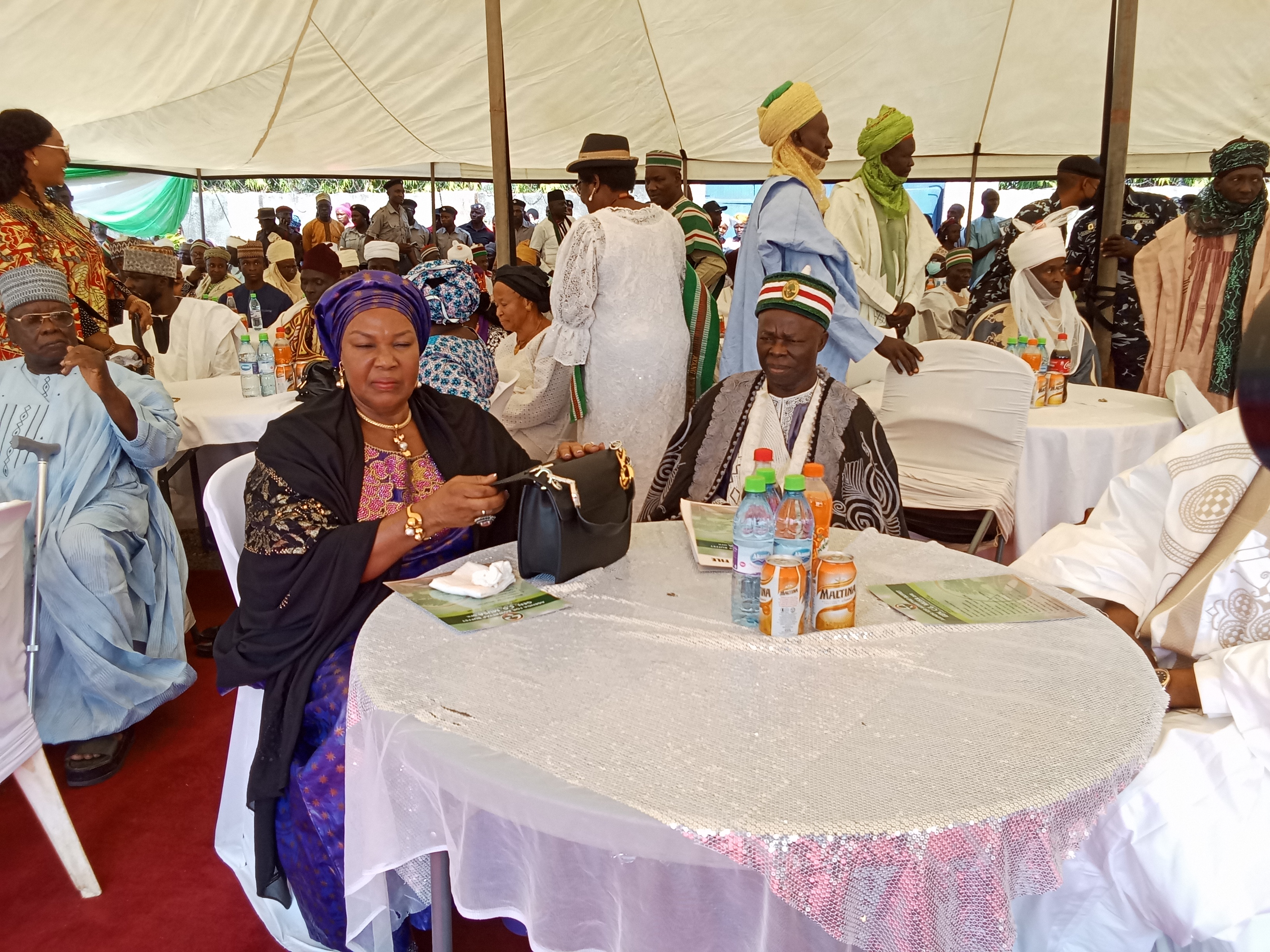
Agwatyap (right) and wife (left) during Buffet organised in his Atak Njei palace in honour of the Nigerian Chief of Defence Staff, Christopher Gwabin Musa, on 31 December 2023.

== Career ==
Yahaya began working with the Kaduna State government in 1976 and became:

- Town Planning Officer II, in 1977;
- Chief Town Planning Officer, 1987;
- Kaduna State Director, Town and Country Planning in 1989;
- General Manager, Kaduna State Urban Planning and Development Authority (KASUPDA) between 1990 and 1993.

He also became:

- Caretaker Chairman of Kaduna North Local Government Area between April, 1994 - March, 1996.

Hence, he returned to work with:

- The Bureau for Lands, Surveys and Country Planning of Kaduna State as Director, Town and Country Planning between 1996 and 1998.

He then became:

- Permanent Secretary, Ministry of Water Resources, between January, 1999 - January, 2000;
- Permanent Secretary, Ministry of Works and Transportation, February, 2000 - November, 2001;
- Public Service Office, Office of the Head of Service Commission, Kaduna State between December, 2001 - September, 2003;
- Public Service Office, Office of the Head of Service, State House, Kawo, between October, 2003 - January 10, 2010, where he retired from civil service.

Yahaya was then appointed as Chairman of the Interim Management Committee, Zangon Kataf Local Government Area between June 20, 2011 - November 2012; and

- Served as a member of the Governing Board of the National Youth Service Corps after retirement from civil service.

== Memberships and awards ==
=== Memberships ===
Yahaya had been a de facto member of the:

- Town Planning Registration Council (of Nigeria), since 1989;
- Fellow Nigerian Institute of Town Planners (FNITP)

He is also a registered Town Planner.

=== Awards ===
He was awarded:

- National Productivity Merit Award in 1991; and
- Knight of Saint of Mulumba (KSM).
- Papal Knight of St.Gregory by Pope Francis in 2023

== State detention ==
After the Zangon Kataf disturbances of May 1992 in which at least 21 indigenous Atyap people were arrested and left in detention without charge or trial under Decree 2 of 1984 enacted by the Nigerian military government, Dominic G. Yahaya (then a civil servant) was one of those unjustly detained and kept separately in a group of six before later being separated including Bala Ade Dauke (the then District Head of Zangon Katab and future Agwatyap I), Maj. Gen. Zamani Lekwot (rtd.), ACP Juri Babang Ayok (rtd.), Major John Atomic Kude (rtd.), and Peter Lekwot (younger brother to Maj. Gen. Z. Lekwot - who alongside Elias Manza and others were sentenced to death), as "Special Class" prisoners.

== Enthronement ==
Yahaya, at the demise of Harrison Bungwon, Agwatyap II, was chosen to be the next Agwatyap of Atyap Chiefdom, to lead the Atyap people. On Saturday, November 12, 2016, he was handed over the staff of office by the Kaduna State governor in the Atak Njei palace.

== Jumma Yahaya Gambo foundation ==
In early November 2023, Yahaya launched the Jumma Yahaya Gambo Foundation to cater for the educational needs of victims of the attacks by Fulani terrorists in his Chiefdom.

Dominic Yahaya Aminyam royal house Born: 10 January 1950
Regnal titles
Preceded by Harrison Bungwon	Agwatyap; 2016–present	Succeeded by Yet to be named
