= Kyuka Lilymjok =

Nigerian writer

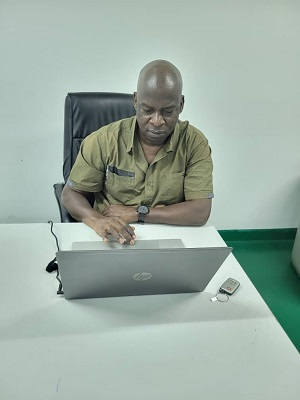
- Born: Adamu Kyuka Usman Lilymjok; 24 September 1965 (age 60); Bafai-Kanai, Kaduna State, Nigeria
- Education: Bayero University, Kano (BA, LLM); Ahmadu Bello University, Zaria (PhD)
- Occupations: Professor of law writer

Kyuka Lilymjok (also known as Adamu Kyuka Usman and Adamu Lilymjok; born 24 September 1965, Bafoi-Kanai, Nigeria) is a Nigerian writer, political thinker, philosopher, and professor of law at Ahmadu Bello University (ABU), Zaria, Nigeria.

== Early life and education ==
Kyuka Lilymjok was born into poverty in rural Nigeria. He started primary school in 1973 and then attended Government Secondary School, Katagum, Bauchi State, where he obtained the General Certificate in Education (GCE) and proceeded to Bayero University Kano where he graduated with an LL.B. Second Class Honours (Upper Division) in 1990. He graduated from the Nigerian Law School, Victoria Island, Lagos in 1991 with a BL Honours degree, and was called to the Nigerian Bar the same year and proceeded to private legal practice. In 1994, he was appointed assistant lecturer in the faculty of law Ahmadu Bello University, Zaria and enrolled for a master's degree programme in the same university graduating in 1998. In 2005, he obtained a doctorate degree in law and became a law professor in 2012.

== Positions held ==
As at May 2016, he was the Special Assistant to President Muhammadu Buhari on legal matters, research and documentation. He reportedly spoke as a keynote speaker on 16 May 2016, at the Nigeria Bar Association (NBA) Kaduna Branch Law Week at the canopies, U/Rimi, Kaduna, Kaduna State on the present administration's fight against corruption.

In June 2016, Kyuka was appointed as Secretary of a technical committee on fuel price hike inaugurated by the Nigerian Federal government, representing the Office of the Secretary to the Government of the Federation.

In May 2020, Kyuka was appointed Chair of the Governing Board of the Universal Basic Education Commission. Prior to this, he had been serving in the department of Commercial Law, Ahmadu Bello University (ABU), Zaria.

== Political engagements ==
In 2002, Lilymjok published a book on the former Nigerian military Head-of-State, Muhammadu Buhari, titled Muhammadu Buhari: The Spirit of a Man.

After the 2003 Nigerian presidential election, he was also part of the legal team which stood by Buhari to challenge the result of the election in the Supreme Court, said to have been won by the incumbent president of Nigeria, Chief Olusegun Obasanjo, GCFR. After the final judgement was passed in favour of the incumbent president and the PDP, he published a critique to show his displeasure in the ruling, titled: Buhari Vs Obasanjo: Law and Justice on the Cross.

When Buhari moved to the newly formed All Progressives Congress (APC) in which he was to contest for the fifth consecutive time against the incumbent president, Dr. Goodluck Ebele Jonathan, GCFR, Lilymjok's alliance followed suit and was a core member of the new party and supporter of the man he so admired.

He served as Deputy Director of the Policy, Research and Strategy Committee of the council in the 2019 presidential polls in which now President Buhari was contesting for a second term in office, and served also as the APC Returning Officer for Kaduna State in the 2019 gubernatorial elections in which Nasir Elrufai ran for re-election and was reported to have won, even though the issue was strongly contested in court by the PDP candidate, just as in the case of the presidential election.

== Publications ==
Adamu Kyuka Usman has many works of fiction in his name and he was one of the two Association of Nigerian Authors (ANA)/Jacaranda literary prize award winners for Prose through his book Sieged, in the year 2011.

=== Literature ===
Books

- Hope in Anarchy (2005; OCLC 70786663)
- The Village Tradesman (2005; ISBN 9783748009)
- The Unknown Vulture (2009; OCLC 754147391)
- The Butcher's Wife (2011; ISBN 9781467000857)
- Bivan's House (2011; ISBN 9789547552)
- Sieged (2011; OCLC 828051304)
- The Death of Eternity (2012; ISBN 9781466942547)
- The Lord Mammon (2012; OCLC 890390253)
- The Lone Piper and the Birds' Case (2012; OCLC 890144504)
- The Disappointed Three (2012; ISBN 9781466933828)
- The Mad Professor of Babeldu (2013; ISBN 9781466982727)
- My Headmaster (2017; ISBN 9781426986819)
- The Heart of Jacob (2017; ISBN 9785739988)
- A Journey of Hell to Heaven (2020; ISBN 9789547536)
- Lost to the Wind (2021; ISBN 9798717451666)
- Broke (2021; ISBN 9789789741496)
- Ebelebe (2021; ISBN 9789789692224)
- Farewell to Peace (2021; ISBN 9789789547548)
- Idiotic (2021; ISBN 9798720456092)
- Gods of my Fathers (2021; ISBN 9789789547562)
- Don't Forget to tell the Masquerade (2023; ISBN 9798375229492)
- And Death Finally Died (2023; ISBN 9798375227306)
- My Letter to the Devil (2021; ISBN 9798720583521)
- Our Lady with the Sword
- Return of the Oracle and other Short Stories
- Sick
- Slates and Bowls
- Stupid
- Tales of Tartarus
- The Butcher's Wife
- The Dark Star North
- The Deportee
- The Devil's Reply to my Letter
- The Fall of Heaven (2021; ISBN 9789692242)
- The Old Woman and the Birds
- The Rainmaker and the Blacksmith
- The Wind Scripts
- The World Conference in Heaven
- Twilight for a Vulture

=== Law ===
- Nigeria Oil and Gas Law (2017; ISBN 9789875477551)
- Environmental Protection Law and Practice (2017; ISBN 9789789584437)
- The Theory and Practice of International Economy (2017; ISBN 9789875477568)
- Nigeria Oil and Gas Industry: Institutions, Issues, Laws and Policies (2018; OCLC 1142032316)
- Law and Practice of Equity and Trust (2021; ISBN 9798738822681)

=== Others ===
- Muhammadu Buhari: The Spirit of a Man (2002; ISBN 9789780562595)
- "Buhari Vs. Obasanjo: Law and Justice on the Cross" (in ABU Journal of Public and International Law, 2007)
- "The Oracles of Global Economic Recession V. The Witches of Free Trade" (in ABU Journal of Commercial Law, 2008– 2009)

== Personal life ==
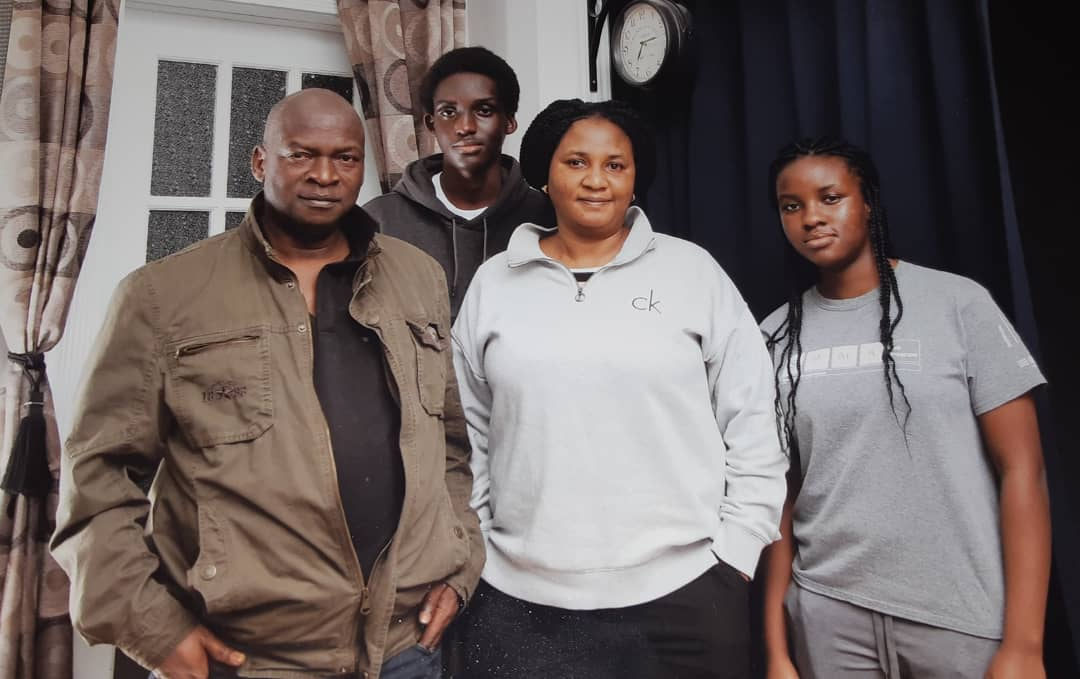
Kyuka Lilymjok, wife (Maria) and children

Lilymjok is married with three children. He lived with them in Canada from 2014 to 2015 before returning alone to Nigeria in 2015.
