= Harrison Bungwon =

Monarch of the Atyap Chiefdom

Engr. Dr. Harrison Bungwon
- Agwatyap II

Monarch of Atyap Chiefdom
- In office: 2005 – 6 April 2016
- Coronation: 2005
- Predecessor: Bala Ade Dauke, A̠gwatyap I
- Successor: Dominic Gambo Yahaya, A̠gwatyap III
- Born: 25 November 1949; Bafoi, Kanai, Northern Region, British Nigeria
- Died: 6 April 2016 (aged 66)
Names
- English: Harrison Yusuf Bungwon; Tyap: Harrison Isuu Bunggwon
- House: Agbaat
- Father: Bungwon Yawa
- Mother: Atoh Bungwon
- Religion: Evangelical Christianity
- Occupation: Engineer, educationist

Styles of Agwatyap II
- Reference style: His Royal Highness
- Spoken style: Your Royal Highness
- Alternative style: Tyap: A̱gwam (King)

Engr. Dr. Harrison Yusuf Bungwon (Tyap: Harrison Isuu Bunggwon) FNSE (25 November 1949 – 6 April 2016) was a paramount ruler of Atyap Chiefdom a Nigerian traditional state in southern Kaduna State, Nigeria. He was also known by the title Agwatyap II.

== Early life and education ==
Bungwon was born to A̠tyoli Bungwon Yawa and A̠yanga̠li Atoh Bungwon on 25 November 1949 in Bafoi, Ka̠nai District, Atyapland, Northern Region, British Nigeria (now in southern Kaduna State, Nigeria). His father died in 1953, when he was only four years old.

His educational career began in January 1957 at the age of seven in Native Authority Junior Primary School, Bafwoi-Ka̠nai (Gora Bafai). After passing his entrance examination in 1961, he got admitted into Native Authority Senior Primary School, Kachia. In 1963, Bungwon got admitted into Government Technical School, Soba, Zaria, where he had a two and a half year stint before he got admitted in 1965 into the prestigious Government Technical College, Kano. He thereafter developed the interest in studying Mechanical engineering while in Government Technical College, Kano, which prompted him to apply for and successfully got awarded a Bureau for External Aid Scholarship to study in the USSR in 1969 on completion of his secondary school level, form five.

Between 1971 – 1975, he studied mechanical engineering and obtained a bachelor's degree (B.Tech.) and master's degree (M.Tech.) at the Byelorussian Technical University, Minsk, where he graduated with distinction. In 1977, he proceeded for his doctorate (Ph.D.) programme to the University of Manchester Institute of Science and Technology, United Kingdom and graduated in 1980.

== Career ==
Bungwon was a scholar, an Engineer, a teacher emeritus, a diplomat and a renown fellow of the Nigeria Society of Engineers with over 16 years of scholarship, teaching in one of Africa's polytechnics, Kaduna Polytechnic.

Between 1986 and 2002, Bungwon served as:

- Director, Research and Development Centre;
- Scientific Adviser, Defence Industries Corporation of Nigeria;
- Commissioner for Works and Transport, Kaduna State;
- Project manager of the suspended Military Embroidary Factory, Abuja;
- Member, Federal Government Experts Committee on Nigeria Machine Tools Ltd., Osogbo, Osun State;
- Elected member of the Constituent Assembly;
- External Exerminer in mechanical engineering, Plateau, Katsina, Idah (Kogi State), and Kwara State Polytechnics.
- In his domain, he did serve as the first Chairman, Board of Governors, Zangon Kataf Community Technical and Vocational School.

In September 2002, Dr. H. Y. Bungwon bowed out of the engineering service after several years of meritorious service to his motherland of the pinnacle of his state government.

== Awards and memberships ==
=== Awards ===
In recognition of his career of excellence, Dr. H. Y. Bungwon was a recipient of several honours and awards including:

- Russian Red Diploma of Distinction (1975)
- Nigeria Society of Engineers' Merit Award (2002)
- Traditional Title of Yariman Atyap (2003).

=== Memberships ===
As a Manchester-trained Engineer, Bungwon had been an associate member of the Institute of Industrial Managers, United Kingdom; a member of the American Institute of Industrial Engineers and a registered engineer with the Council for the Regulation of Engineering of Nigeria (COREN).

== Enthronement ==
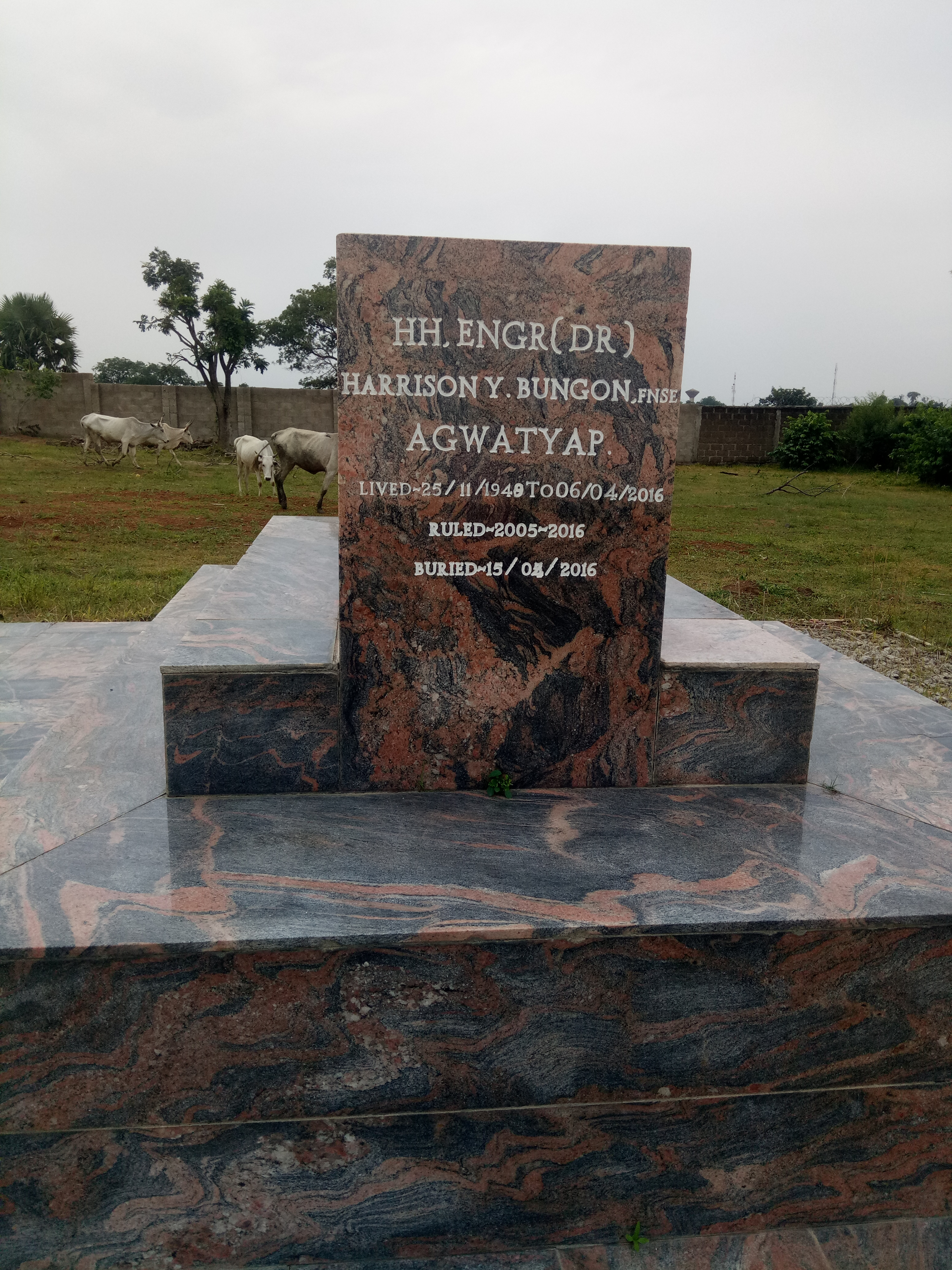
Resting place of Agwam H. Y. Bungwon.

At the demise of his predecessor, HRH Agwam B. A. Dauke (Agwatyap I) in 2005, Bungwon reigned as Agwatyap II and was the second indigenous Agwam (Monarch) of the Atyap Nation. He held the position for about 11 years before passing onto eternal glory in the cold morning of 6 April 2016. He was a first-class chief and his demise was seen as a great loss and shocking.

== Legacy ==
During his years of active service as a civil servant, Bungwon contributed to the growth and development of engineering study in Nigeria and beyond. Even till today, his legacy is still making an impact on Kaduna State engineering as a whole.

Like a sensitive father as he was, HRH Agwam Dr. H. Y. Bungwon knew the meaning of service. As a practising Christian, he had kept close in mind the words of the Lord Jesus Christ which says:

"Whosoever Will Be Great Among You, Shall Be Your Minister" (Which Means Servant.) – Mark 10:43 (KJV).

Throughout his life, HRH carried out responsibilities related to serving others.

He has flown several kites but has still accepted to come down as Agwatyap, Atyap Traditional Council, Atak Njei, Zangon Kataf.

As the second indigenous Royal Father to rule over the Atyap Nation, Agwam Dr. H. Y. Bungwon had a great responsibility meeting the expectations of Atyap and her neighbours. In his own words:

"I am glad my own experience working in the public sector, and as one time, Dean of a school, provided me with the opportunity to have dialogue with many leaders".

But he had a vision. In his vision, he sets a sterling example, not only to other chiefdoms, but also to leaders in the state.

At the demise of Bungwon, the lawmaker representing Zangon Kataf/Jaba federal constituency, Barr. Sunday Marshall Katung described him as a peacemaker who in his words added...:

"He devoted his life to the progress of his people in the areas of agriculture, education and socioeconomic development of Atyap people and Kaduna State as a whole."

Harrison Bungwon Agbaat royal house Born: 25 November 1949 Died: 6 April 2016
Regnal titles
Preceded by Bala Ade Dauke	Agwatyap; 2006–2016	Succeeded by Dominic Yahaya
