= Bafoi =

Bafoi Bafwoi or Sanai Bafai, Bafai Gora, Bafoi Kanai
- Village
- Location within Nigeria
- Coordinates: 09°52′N 08°17′E
- Country: Nigeria
- State: Kaduna State
- LGA: Zangon Kataf
- District: Kanai
- Time zone: UTC+01:00 (WAT)
- Postal code: 802145
- Climate: Aw

Bafoi (also Bafoi Kanai, Bafai Gora) is a village in Kanai district of Zangon Kataf Local Government Area in southern Kaduna state in the Middle Belt region of Nigeria. The postal code of the area is 802145.

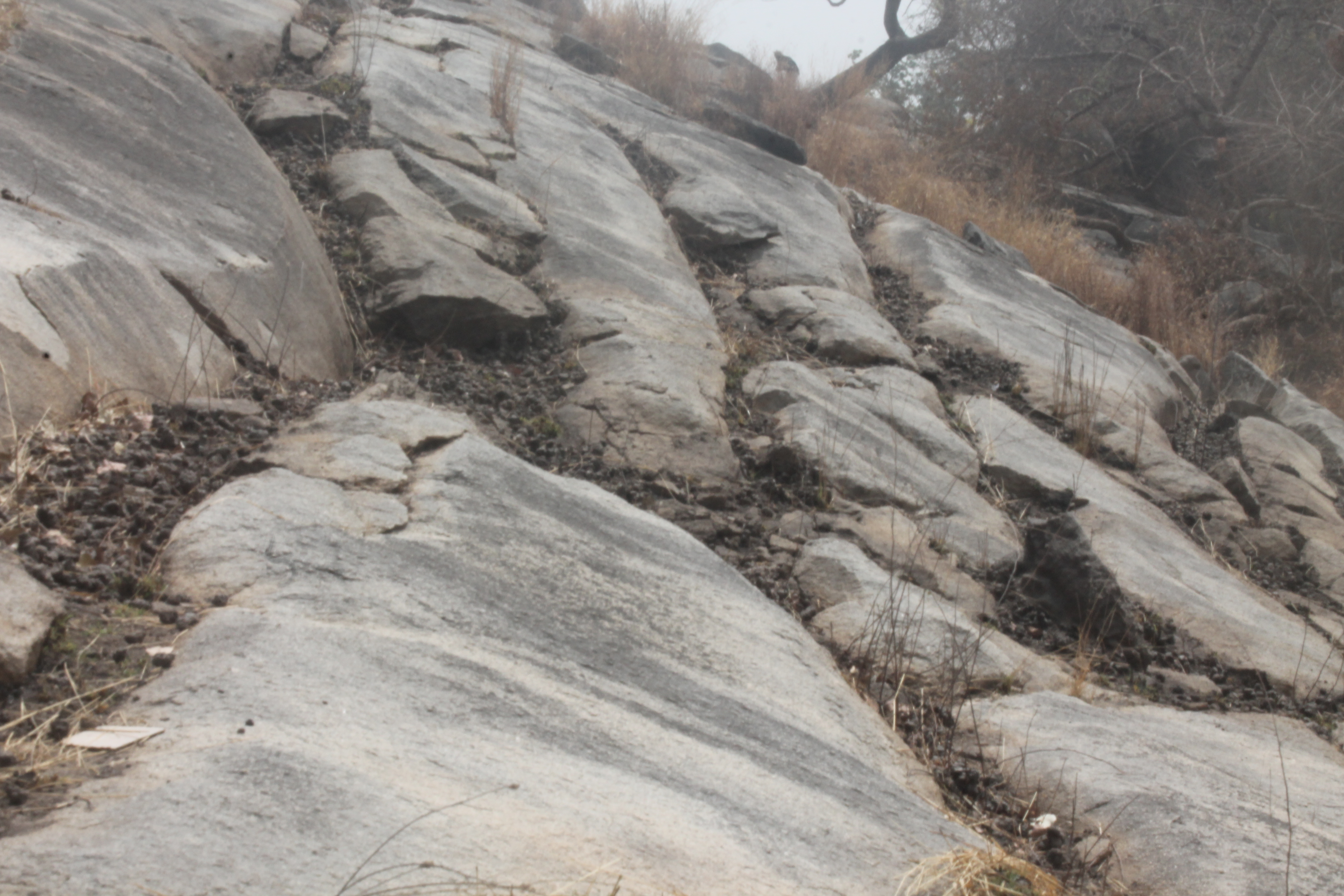
Cross section of a rocky terrain in Bafoi.

== Settlements ==
Before 2017, it used to be a district of its own. However, it was later merged with Kanai district. Among the settlements in this district were:

- Ayak
- Aza Magoni
- Azambat
- Bafoi (also Sanai)
- Chen Didan
- Ma-Avwuong
- Makura
- Sagwaza

== Education ==
Bafoi is home to two Universal Basic Education (UBE) primary schools, a Local Government Education Authority (LGEA) primary school, and a Government Secondary School (GSS). These schools provide basic and intermediate education to pupils in the immediate and surrounding environments.

== Notable people ==
- Senator Isaiah Balat
- Breg. Gen. Simon Katunku
- Prof. Adamu Kyuka Usman (Lilymjok Kyuka)
- David Elisha Lahu

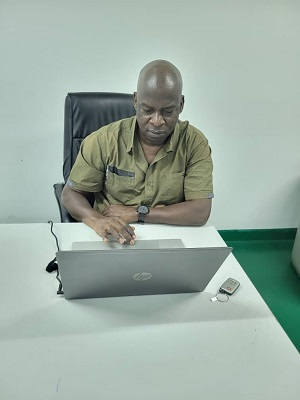
Professor Adamu Kyuka Usman; a notable son of Bafoi Gora.

== See also ==
- Atyap chiefdom
- List of villages in Kaduna State
