= Atakligan =

Magamiya A̱takligan, Taligan Agami, Magami, Magamia
- Village
- Location within Nigeria
- Coordinates: 09°47′N 08°26′E
- Country: Nigeria
- State: Kaduna State
- LGA: Zangon Kataf
- District: Zonzon
- Elevation: 682 m (2,238 ft)
- Time zone: UTC+01:00 (WAT)
- Postal code: 802143
- Climate: Aw

Atakligan, or Taligan (Hausa: Magamiya) is a village community in Zonzon district of Zangon Kataf Local Government Area, southern Kaduna state in the Middle Belt region of Nigeria. The postal code for the village is 802143. The nearest airport to the community is the Yakubu Gowon Airport, Jos.

== Geography ==
=== Landscape ===
Atakligan possesses an elevation of 682m.

=== Climate ===
Atakligan has an average annual temperature of about 27.9 °C (82.2 °F), average yearly highs of about 32 °C (90 °F) and lows of 22 °C (72 °F), with zero rainfalls at the ends and beginnings of the year with a yearly average precipitation of about 14 mm (0.55 in), and an average humidity of 51.1%.

Climate data for Magami (682m altitude)
Month	Jan	Feb	Mar	Apr	May	Jun	Jul	Aug	Sep	Oct	Nov	Dec	Year
Record high °C (°F)	34 (93)	37 (99)	38 (100)	38 (100)	35 (95)	32 (90)	29 (84)	27 (81)	29 (84)	32 (90)	34 (93)	33 (91)	33.2 (91.8)
Mean daily maximum °C (°F)	33 (91)	36 (97)	39 (102)	38 (100)	35 (95)	30 (86)	26 (79)	25 (77)	26 (79)	31 (88)	34 (93)	31 (88)	32 (90)
Daily mean °C (°F)	27 (81)	29 (84)	33 (91)	33 (91)	30 (86)	27 (81)	24 (75)	23 (73)	24 (75)	28 (82)	29 (84)	28 (82)	27.9 (82.2)
Mean daily minimum °C (°F)	18 (64)	20 (68)	24 (75)	26 (79)	24 (75)	23 (73)	22 (72)	20 (68)	21 (70)	22 (72)	21 (70)	22 (72)	21.9 (71.4)
Record low °C (°F)	16 (61)	18 (64)	21 (70)	24 (75)	24 (75)	23 (73)	21 (70)	21 (70)	21 (70)	22 (72)	20 (68)	17 (63)	20.7 (69.3)
Average precipitation mm (inches)	0 (0)	0.6 (0.02)	1.3 (0.05)	5.3 (0.21)	22.6 (0.89)	22.7 (0.89)	28.6 (1.13)	42.1 (1.66)	30.8 (1.21)	13.8 (0.54)	0 (0)	0 (0)	14 (0.6)
Average precipitation days	0	1	2	7	14	18	24	25	25	15	0	0	10.92
Average relative humidity (%)	20	14	27	44	59	77	86	88	86	63	28	21	51.1
Source: World Weather Online

=== Settlements ===
Before 2017, it used to be a district of its own. However, it was later merged with Zonzon district. Among the settlements in this district were:

- Apyia Babum
- Aza Akat
- Chen Akoo
- Makunanshyia
- Manyi Sansak
- Mawuka
- Taligan (Agami) I
- Taligan (Agami) II

== Notable people ==
- AVM Ishaya Aboi Shekari (rtd.), military service
- Agwam (Sir) Dominic Gambo Yahaya (KSM), Agwatyap II

== See also ==
- Atyap chiefdom
- List of villages in Kaduna State
