= Kanai, Nigeria =

Kanai (Gora) Ka̠nai Kanai Mali, Gora Gida
- District and Village
- Location within Nigeria
- Coordinates: 09°56′N 08°18′E
- Country: Nigeria
- State: Kaduna State
- LGA: Zangon Kataf
- Elevation: 802 m (2,631 ft)

Population (1991 estimate)Kaduna State Ministry of Finance and Economic Planning
  - Total: 17,290
- Time zone: UTC+01:00 (WAT)
- Postal code: 802139
- Climate: Aw

Kanai (Hausa: Gora) is a district as well as a village in Zangon Kataf Local Government Area of southern Kaduna state in the Middle Belt region of Nigeria. The postal code of the area is 802139.

== Geography ==
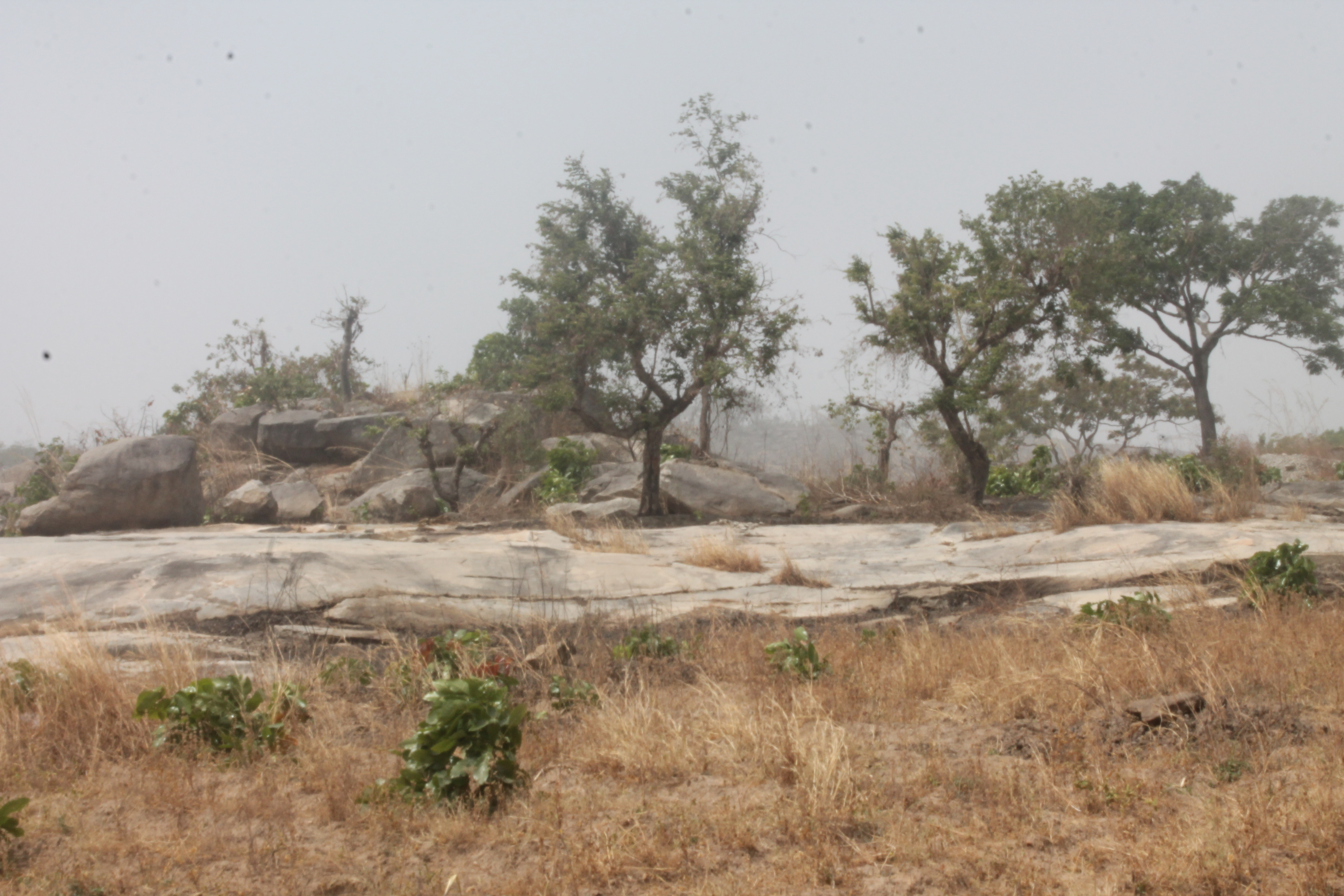
Young trees in Bafoi Kanai during the cold harmattan dry weather.

=== Landscape ===
Kanai possesses an elevation of 802m.

=== Climate ===
Kanai Mali (H. Gora Gida) has an average annual temperature of about 24.8 °C (76.6 °F), average yearly highs of about 28.6 °C (83.5 °F) and lows of 18.8 °C (65.8 °F), with zero rainfalls at the ends and beginnings of the year with a yearly average precipitation of about 28.1 mm (1.11 in), and an average humidity of 53.7%, similar to that of neighbouring towns Kagoro and Zonkwa.

Climate data for Kanai (802m altitude)
Month	Jan	Feb	Mar	Apr	May	Jun	Jul	Aug	Sep	Oct	Nov	Dec	Year
Record high °C (°F)	31 (88)	33 (91)	34 (93)	34 (93)	31 (88)	29 (84)	26 (79)	25 (77)	27 (81)	29 (84)	30 (86)	29 (84)	29.8 (85.6)
Mean daily maximum °C (°F)	29 (84)	32 (90)	34 (93)	33 (91)	30 (86)	27 (81)	24 (75)	22 (72)	24 (75)	28 (82)	29 (84)	31 (88)	28.6 (83.5)
Daily mean °C (°F)	24 (75)	26 (79)	29 (84)	29 (84)	26 (79)	24 (75)	21 (70)	20 (68)	22 (72)	25 (77)	25 (77)	26 (79)	24.8 (76.6)
Mean daily minimum °C (°F)	15 (59)	17 (63)	21 (70)	22 (72)	20 (68)	19 (66)	18 (64)	17 (63)	18 (64)	20 (68)	19 (66)	19 (66)	18.8 (65.8)
Record low °C (°F)	14 (57)	16 (61)	20 (68)	21 (70)	21 (70)	20 (68)	19 (66)	18 (64)	19 (66)	19 (66)	18 (64)	15 (59)	18.3 (64.9)
Average precipitation mm (inches)	0 (0)	1 (0.0)	3.1 (0.12)	13.5 (0.53)	35.5 (1.40)	54.2 (2.13)	71.2 (2.80)	69 (2.7)	60.3 (2.37)	29.3 (1.15)	0.1 (0.00)	0 (0)	28.1 (1.11)
Average precipitation days	0	1	4	12	23	28	31	30	29	18	0	0	14.7
Average relative humidity (%)	24	18	28	48	66	80	88	90	86	61	32	23	53.7
Source: World Weather Online

=== Settlements ===
The following are some major settlements in Kanai district include:

- Adidyong
- Atabat Atanyeang
- Atabum
- Atak Ma-Gangkwon
- Apyifak
- Apyimbu
- Ayak
- Aza Magoni
- Bafoi (also Sanai)
- Bato (Boto)
- Gan
- Kakwa
- Kanai Mali (also Atsung Abyek)
- Ma-Adangung
- Ma-Avwuong
- Magwafan (H. Bakin Kogi)
- Manyii-Chendidan (H. Rafin Wawa)
- Ma-Pama
- Sagwaza
- Sako
- Sankwap (also Runji)
- Sashyat
- Sazwat
- Sop Gandu

== Demographics ==
The district consists primarily of the Atyap people.

=== Population ===
At the 1963 Nigerian population census, the population of the entire district was put at 8,660. On the Kaduna State government estimate for 1991, however, the population was put at 17,290.

== Economy ==
Agriculture is the major occupation of the people, being that the area is primarily rural.

== Domestic water supply ==
A survey carried out in 2012 in three villages in the district namely, Sankhwap (Runji), Kanai Mali (H. Gora Gida), and Sagwaza, covering 88 households discovered that over half of them rely on shallow hand-dug wells and natural water bodies which are prone to drought, with only 3% of them able to harvest rainwater for usage.

== Notable people ==
- Senator Isaiah Balat, politician, entrepreneur
- DJ Bally, DJ, music producer
- Agwam (Dr.) Harrison Yusuf Bungwon, Agwatyap II
- Agwam Bala Ade Dauke, Agwatyap I
- Prof. Kyuka Usman Lilymjok, lawyer, writer

== See also ==
- Atak Nfang
- Atyap chiefdom
- Jei
- List of villages in Kaduna State
- Zonzon
