= John Edward Philips =

American author, historian and academic

- Born: 1952 (age 73–74)
- Occupations: Historian; Editor
- Writing career
- Notable works: Black Africa's Largest Islamic Kingdom Before Colonialism: Royal Ribats Of Kano and Sokoto (2016); Writing African History (2005); Slave Elites in the Middle East and Africa: A Comparative Study (2000))

John Edward Philips (born 1952) is an American historian. He is a retired Professor of International Society, Hirosaki University of Japan, with many works on African history. After taking his PhD in history at UCLA in 1992, he taught at several universities in Japan, especially Hirosaki University (1997-2018) and Akita Keizaihoka University (1988-1997). Since retiring in 2018, he has been an adjunct professor in several universities in Nigeria.

Regarding Slave Elites in the Middle East and Africa: A Comparative Study (2000), reviewer Linda S. Northrup states: "This volume constitutes a rich resource for the study of slavery and slave elites....the research may extend well beyond the interests of historians, for the study of this phenomenon may have implications for understanding the roots of instability in the Islamic world today."

His edited book Writing African History (2005), was named a Choice Outstanding Academic Title in 2006. Copies are held in over 600 academic libraries worldwide. Reviewer Saheed Aderinto states:

This book is to date the most multidisciplinary volume on African historiography....The editor adds value to the content of the essays with a brilliant introduction and conclusion, which explore the meaning of history and historical research. In the concluding chapter, he provides a step -to -step approach to the following closely related task: choosing a topic, data collection, data evaluation, data organization and writing.

== Publications ==
=== Author/editor ===
- Black Africa's Largest Islamic Kingdom Before Colonialism: Royal Ribats Of Kano and Sokoto (2016) details
- “The Early Issues of the First Newspaper in Hausa Gaskiya Ta Fi Kwabo, 1939–1945.” History in Africa, vol. 41, 2014, pp. 425–31. online
- editor, Writing African History (2005).
- “Hausa in the Twentieth Century: An Overview.” Sudanic Africa, vol. 15, (2004), pp. 55–84. online.
- Spurious Arabic: Hausa and Colonial Nigeria (2000)
- Domestic Aliens: The Zangon Kataf Crisis and the African Concept of Stranger. London (2000)
- coeditor, Slave Elites in the Middle East and Africa: A Comparative Study, edited with Miura Toru (Kegan Paul International. 2000)
- “African Studies in Japan.” African Studies Review, vol. 40, no. 3, 1997, pp. 161–80. online
- “Some Recent Thinking on Slavery in Islamic Africa and the Middle East.” Middle East Studies Association Bulletin, vol. 27, no. 2, 1993, pp. 157–62. online
- "The African heritage of white America" (1990)
- “African Smoking and Pipes.” The Journal of African History, vol. 24, no. 3, 1983, pp. 303–19. online

=== Selected reviews ===
- “Kindred concerns and an abortive alliance.” Journal of African History, vol. 53, no. 3, 2012, pp. 419–21. online.
- "Telling Stories", American Historical Review, vol. 113, no. 2, 2008, pp. 620–620. online
- "Concubines and Power," Africa: Journal of the International African Institute, Vol. 76, No. 3 (2006), pp. 450–451 online
- "The Trouble with Nigeria" African Studies Review, Vol. 48, No. 2 (Sep., 2005), pp. 133–139. online
- "Handlists of Islamic Manuscripts: Nigeria" British Journal of Middle Eastern Studies, Vol. 23, No. 2 (Nov., 1996), pp. 243–245. online
- "View of Islam: A Multi-Media Tour, (CD-ROM)" Middle East Studies Association Bulletin, Vol. 30, No. 1 (July 1996), pp. 125–126 online
