= 1992 Zangon Kataf crises =

Land-ownership, trading rights and ethno-religious crises in Nigeria

- Location: 9°47′N 8°22′E
- Date: 6 February 1992; 15–17 May 1992
- Target: Hausa civilians
- Attack type: Shooting; Immolation; Massacre; Arson
- Weapons: Guns, machetes, bows and arrows
- Deaths: 566 (total official figures)
- Perpetrator: Atyap residents
- Motive: Land issues Trading rights Ethnic discrimination Jihad

The genesis of the 1992 Zangon Kataf crises could at least be traced to the onset of the British imperial regime in the Northern Region of Nigeria, in which the Atyap people began reporting the loss of land to the Hausas. In 1922, it was reported that a large piece of land was acquired by the Emir of Zaria, Dalhatu Uthman Yero, who failed to compensate the indigenous population of the region. In 1966, the land was provided to the Hausa trading settlement in the heart of Mabatado (pronounced Mabǝrǝdǝu), called "Zangon Kataf", by the emir, Muhammad Usman. The Atyap resided within the district, in the Zaria Province of the Northern Region of, initially, British Nigeria, which became independent Nigeria. It was to remain utilized as a marketplace, where the indigenous Atyap people were banned from trading pork and beer by the settlers.

Tensions steadily increased, flaring up in February 1992 over a proposal to move the market to a new site, away from land transferred to the Hausas. The proposal by the first Atyap head of the Zangon Kataf Local Government Area was favored by the Atyap, who could trade beer and pork on the neutral site; however, it remained opposed by the Hausa, who feared the loss of trading privileges. Over 60 people were killed in the February clashes; further violence broke out in Zango on 15 May and 16 May, with 400 people killed and numerous buildings destroyed. When the news reached Kaduna, rampaging Hausa youths killed many Christians of all ethnic groups in retaliation.

In January 1992, the first indigenous local government chairman, A.C.P. Juri Babang Ayok (retired), announced plans for relocating the same market to a neutral site where all indigenous individuals and settlers would be free to trade; this would thereby reduce the Hausa monopoly and decongest the old market, which suffered from unhygienic conditions because of the very slight distance between businesses. However, this move was unpopular with Muslim northern settlers. The proposed move began to serve as fuel for rising tensions between Muslims and their Atyap hosts, who welcomed the initiative for a market move.

== February 1992 crisis ==
A Hausa resident of the Zango region, Alhaji Danbala A.T.K., reportedly took the issue to court, in a bid to stop the market being moved to a new site; however, this court case continued without success. On 6 February 1992, as trade commenced within the novel market, it was reported that Danbala organized a Hausa/Fulani mob at the new market site, murdering an Atyap man, Shan Anwai. This event led to the initiation of a riot. According to official figures, 95 people were killed, 252 injured, 133 houses burnt or destroyed and 26 farmland enterprises destroyed.

A commission of enquiry, directed by Justice Rahila Cudjoe, was established by the Kaduna State Government for the completion of research on the cause of the crisis.

== May 1992 crisis ==
According to news sources, the Atyap village heads then threatened to recapture the land forcefully taken by the emir Yero in 1922 and given to the Hausas. In response to this threat, the Hausa population began to uproot recently planted crops on Atyap land. Several Atyap individuals were attacked and killed on their farms. The Izala Islamic Group, a Hausa and Fulani group, requested assistance from the Sultan of Sokoto, Ibrahim Dasuki, for the completion of a jihad against the Atyap. Reports of police failing to arrest and prosecute those implicated in the February incidents began to circulate.

The issues of the uprooting of crops on Atyap farmlands and the killing of Atyap people on their farms began the second crisis, which lasted from 15 to 16 May 1992. When rumors of events within Zangon Kataf reached Kaduna, Zaria, Ikara and other regions within the state where Hausa populations remained persecuted, rampaging Hausa and Fulani youths began killing many Christians from all ethnic groups in retaliation.

Kaduna, Birnin Gwari, and Ikara

The Hausa of Kaduna were the first to respond to the call; Hausa youths took to the streets, killing and burning houses belonging to the Atyap and other non-Atyap Christians in Tudun Wada, Ungwar Muazu, Kawo, Rigasa and other areas. According to official figures, 250 individuals were killed, more than the total within Zangon Kataf; similar events occurred within Birnin Gwari and Ikara, northwest and northeast of Kaduna, respectively.

Zaria: Riots within the Zaria region began on Sunday, 17 May 1992, when the Christian Association of Nigeria's (CAN) secretary, Rev. Bitrus Katung, was hacked inside his house by rampaging Hausa youths. An Atyap man in the next house, and one Koro man opposite Katung's house, was also murdered. Houses were burnt in Gyellesu. In Tudun Wada, a Bajju man, Baba Maigemu, was also murdered. The New York Times reported that at least 46 corpses were brought into the Ahmadu Bello Teaching Hospital.

=== Casualties ===
According to official figures, the May 1992 tragedy was said to have claimed 471 lives (250 in Kaduna, 188 in Zangon Kataf and the other 33 from Zaria, Ikara and other areas), 518 persons injured, 229 houses burnt or destroyed, and 218 vehicles destroyed or burnt. Although the Zango Hausa community claimed to have lost 1,528 persons, many Hausas reportedly fled the Zangon Kataf area afterward; some subsequently returned. Africa Watch reported on a visit to Zangon Kataf in April 1993; the organisation stated that a year ago, the then Head-of-state General Babangida reportedly visited Zangon Kataf a few days after the riot in May 1992. During this visit, he promised to compensate those who had their houses destroyed. Africa Watch reported that "it was clear that the government was engaged in rebuilding the Hausa community".

== Inquiry and trials ==
=== Inquiry ===
In a report issued on 30 March 1993, Africa Watch described the arrest and trial of retired Maj. Gen. Zamani Lekwot and six others following the riots in Zango-Kataf and Kaduna. In the Justice Rahila Cudjoe Commission of Inquiry, attorneys representing both the Atyap and the Hausa-Fulani presented their reports before the commission. Five of the panel members were Hausa-Fulani and the reports by the commission were not immediately made public. In the wake of the riot in May 1992, hundreds of Atyap people were arrested. At least 21 were left in detention with no formal charges laid or with no trial conducted, under Decree 2 of 1984, while many other individuals were released.

The Atyap community representatives pointed out that the main people arrested by the government were Atyap leaders, including the local government Chairman - A.C.P. Juri B. Ayok (rtd), the District Head, Bala Ade Dauke Gora, several village heads, and Major General Zamani Lekwot (rtd.); according to the community representatives, these individuals were not arrested for any criminal act, but because of their positions of authority in society. Lekwot's arrest was said to be the result of a feud between him and President Babangida.

On 20 May 1992, the military government officially banned all ethno-religious and regional associations which supported political candidates, thereby worsening the already tense situation existing between the Hausas and other smaller indigenous groups in Kaduna State. These groups resorted to forming underground units to assist them in achieving their political ambitions. Following the crisis in May, the state government altered the authority of the Cudjoe Commission, adding the events which occurred in May to the existing purview of the commission. Because of the perception of bias against the Atyap community within the commission, the lawyers representing them boycotted the inquiries' commission.

Two special tribunals, intended to bypass the standard courts, were prepared by the federal military government to try individuals accused of participating in crimes during the riots. This act was frowned upon by lawyers of the Nigerian Bar, as it was perceived as a move to manipulate the justice system in favor of a particular group.

On 2 June 1992, the first tribunal was enacted; this was chaired by Justice Benedict Okadigbo, with members of the panel including such individuals as: Godwin Graham-Douglas, Alhaji Aminu Malumfashi, Hajia Tani Yusuf, Otunba A. Adeleke Adedoyin, Col. Yusuf Abubakar and Mustapha Wali. The Civil Disturbances (Special Tribunal) Decree No. 53 of 1987, which provided the authority necessary for the establishment of the tribunal, only allowed for a maximum of five members, as pointed out by lawyers; however, the government, following the establishment of the initial tribunal, amended the decree and applied it retroactively, allowing two more persons to be added for a total of seven. This first panel, also identified as the Okadigbo tribunal, included: three Muslim Hausa/Fulani and a military officer; a retired Muslim police officer; and a Christian by the name Godwin Alaye Graham-Douglas. This last individual remained a senior advocate of Nigeria (SAN), who later withdrew from the tribunal; he attributed his absence to a medical condition. The remaining members of the panel produced a decision regardless of his endorsement.

On 8 October 1992, the second tribunal, chaired by Emmanuel Adegbite with panel members included: N. N. Onugha, B. A. Njemanze, Lt. Col. Yakubu Bako, Alhaji Sule Baba Mohammed, Chief L. O. Okoi, and Issac Zakari Dimka. The president, Gen. Ibrahim Babangida, then declared that there would be a presumption of guilt on all those accused by the tribunal in obvious violation of the law which stipulates the right to be presumed innocent until proven guilty, International Criminal law, and also found in Article 7 of the Human and Peoples' Rights of the African Charter.

=== Trials ===
The 13 people from the Zangon Kataf area sentenced to death, were all of Atyap ethnic descent.

On 4 April 1992, the trial of Major General Lekwot and that of his co-accused case began. They were charged with "unlawful assembly, rioting, rioting with arms, and disturbance of public peace". The chairman of the tribunal, Justice Okadigbo, reportedly showed open contempt towards the Chief G. O. K. Ajayi (SAN)-led defense counsel, with another team of the counsel, barrister Emmanuel Toro, expressing his belief that the tribunal was "hell-bent on convicting".

On 2 February 1993, six of the seven accused were sentenced to death by the tribunal. These included: Maj. Gen. Zamani Lekwot (rtd), Maj. James Atomic Kude (rtd), Yunana Karau, Markus Maman, Yahaya Duniyo, and Julius T. Sarki (the village head of Zaman Dabo i.e. Atak Nfang). These decisions by the panel were not subject to appeal, except for a final endorsement by the National Defense Security Council (NDSC) whose made the final decision on the executions. As noted by Emmanuel Toro, "The ruling of the tribunal is still a mystery", being that the decisions of the later disbanded Okadigbo tribunal were never made public even to the attorneys of the individuals convicted and held in the Kaduna Prison, the Abeokuta Prison and the Port Harcourt Prison (as in the case of Major Gen. Lekwot).

Five other accused persons in April 1993 remained in prison after being tried twice. Convicted by the Okadigbo tribunal of unlawful assembly, and by the Adegbite tribunal, they included: Adamu Shekari (the village head in the Zango-Kataf area)—sentenced to three years imprisonment and Peter T. Lekwot (brother of Maj. Gen. Zamani Lekwot)—sentenced to five years imprisonment. Despite their claims of innocence—Peter Lekwot had several witnesses testify that he was in Kaduna attending a meeting when the incident began, and Adamu Shekari who was also in another city at the time, their appeals were never listened to. The other three, namely: Zamani Kazah, Hon. Shekarau Kaah and Sani Adam Jankasa were all acquitted by the Okadigbo tribunal probably because they were all elderly men. (Zamani Kazah the local deputy chairman of the Social Democratic Party (SDP), who was the oldest of them, was at least 80 years old at the time.) The Adegbite tribunal put these five on trial again with charges including culpable homicide. This tribunal later acquitted Adamu Shekari and Peter Lekwot on grounds they were absent from the crime scene at the time of the event but convicting and sentencing the other three previously acquitted by the Okadigbo tribunal to death. They were then moved to the infirmary unit of the Federal Prison in Abeokuta because they were of an advanced age.

At least four others were condemned to death by the tribunals, including: Iliya (Elias) Manza, Ayuba Tache, Jonathan S. Yashim, and Inspector Gankon Dawa Kurfi (rtd). Elias Manza was sentenced to death by the Okadigbo tribunal, while the remaining three were sentenced to death by the Adegbite tribunal. Only three Hausa-Fulanis were tried by either of the two tribunals and, according to their attorney, Mahmood Yahaya, were all acquitted and released.

Among the seven Atyap acquitted by the tribunals although remaining in the Kaduna Prison in custody under Decree 2 of 1984 (which authorized detention without trial), for a while before their later release, include: A.C.P. Juri B. Ayok (rtd.), John Y. Toro, Insp. Timothy Shelu Adam (rtd), Jonah Abashe, Bala Ninyio Bawa, Ayuba Yashim, and Tauna Yakubu.

After the outbreak of the riot the Kaduna State governor immediately removed the Zangon Kataf local government chairman, A.C.P. Juri B. Ayok (rtd.), a member of the SDP who as of June 1993 was the only one in the Zamani Lekwot group to be acquitted of all charges. The governor, a member of the opposition National Republican Convention (NRC) party replaced him with a member of the NRC, Mallam Haruna Zok. He also replaced Ayok's deputy and replaced him with another opposition NRC member without holding a by-election six months after the removal of Ayok and his deputy, which was against the constitution's provisions, and despite a case being filed by lawyers from the Atyap community, challenging the unconstitutional removal, nothing was achieved.

In February 1993, a suit was presented before a Lagos High Court by the local human rights group, the Constitutional Rights Project (CRP), seeking a delay in the Lekwot group executions pending a hearing of their earlier petition filed before the African Commission on Human and Peoples' Rights. A Nigerian human rights lawyer, Chief Mike A. A. Ozekhome, also filed a lawsuit at the same time in the same court seeking to revoke the death sentences. On 5 May 1993, Ozekhome was ruled by the court to lack the locus standi to bring his case. However, it agreed to the CPR's suit, extending a stay of execution on the Lekwot cases to 7 June 1993.

Contrary to prevailing fears, the federal military government did not execute those sentenced to death until Gen. Babangida's tenure elapsed. Even when the interim government headed by Chief Ernest Shonekan came in on August 26, 1993, nothing was done. When General Sani Abacha came into power on 17 November 1993, he did not act on the issue but awaited the final outcome of the African Commission, which discovered gross violations of judicial processes by the tribunals and the outgoing military regime and asked for the release of the convicted men from detention. This, the Abacha regime granted, and they were released in 1996.

=== Others ===
The others implicated in one or the other crisis or who played a role in either of Atyap origin, not mentioned above include: Kato Yashim, Tonak Dabo, James Gandu, Haruna Bityong, Philip Abu, Bala Bonet, Bitrus Kwasau, and Bala N. Bawa. Two other lawyers who played a vital role for the Atyap community were Barrister (Col.) Y. A. Madaki (rtd.) and Barrister Bitrus Duniyo.

== Memorandum release by the Kataf Youth Development Association (KYDA) in March 1993 ==
COULD THIS NATION SPARE A LITTLE TIME TO LISTEN TO THE KATAF?
Kataf Youth Development Association (KYDA)
NATIONAL HEADQUARTERS ZANGON KATAF
P.O. Box 1, Zangon Kataf, Kaduna State. 17th March 1993

1. On 6 February and 15 and 16 May 1992, this Nation had cause to get real angry about happenings at a little Hausa settlement called Zango in the Zangon Kataf Local Government Area. In the first instance, a number of Hausa settlers have physically resisted the legal relocation of the market of the town. The Kataf, the dominant tribe of the area be[ing] happy to see their market relocated where they could now attend without hindrance to let and could now rightly participate in its commerce. Until then, even though this was their district market, none of them had a stall in it neither could they s[ell] commodities of their choices. No wonder, on the day the Local Government decided to shift the market, the Kataf came out in their throngs to participate in this commercial venture so that they were not out-done once more.
2. This physical assault by the Hausa on the Kataf was resisted. It led to the loss of lives and destruction of property on both sides though the Hausa suffered more losses. That the Hausa suffered more is hardly surprising for three main reasons. Firstly, their numbers in the settlement is relatively very very small compared to the number of the Kataf. Secondly, they are located at a position where they are completely surrounded by the Kataf. Thirdly, this was a market day which had brought most Kataf people out to the spot where trouble [was] later to start.
3. This fracas bred a lot of animosity leading to the silent killing of Kataf people who for whatever reason strayed into Zango. There is the example of Sofa Daniel Zwandien, who is Kataf and whose daughter worked and stayed inside Zango town. After the fracas, he rode his bicycle into Zango to ensure both her safety and that of her children. Only his bicycle was later found and until this day, he has not returned home. Also, a number of Kataf women who went into Zango to sell firewood, never returned home. In fact, two of their corpses were discovered in Alhaji Mato's house during the reconstruction of Zango. The police are fully aware of this. Meanwhile, the Kataf Village Heads and Elders, whose responsibility was to ensure peace at all costs and who "wrongly" thought they were the eyes of Government at the Local level, wrote an S.O.S. to Government, stating what grievances they have discerned among their people and asking for an urgent government intervention. They are still in prison today, for making that costly "mistake".
4. To make the Kataf think that Government was taking steps as earlier requested, a peace committee was set up by Government, headed by the Deputy Governor of the State. Both Katafs and Hausas were invited to these meetings. Firstly, the Committee met exclusively with the Hausas and later with the Katafs. They were later brought together and an attempt was made by the Chairman to force the Kataf to accept the Hausa demands as a basis of peace. The Kataf, who had not even received a hearing, rejected this, insisting that they should be heard. The Deputy Governor suddenly closed the meeting declaring that the Hausa demands were a basis of agreement reached at the meeting. The Kataf protested this. The last word from the Deputy Governor was that Kataf present at the meeting would be held responsible for any further disturbance in the Zango. Of course, all those present at that meeting have since been arrested, tried and condemned by the two Federal Government Tribunals. These include[:] Zamani Kazah, Julius Sarki, Zaman Dabo, Shekarau Kaah, Yahaya Duniya and Taunak Dabo.
5. Also, the Kataf were later to discover that the peace committee was an attempt by some powerful individuals in Government at both the State and Federal levels to buy time so as to stock-pile arms and ammunition in Zango with which to deal with the Kataf once and for all. The following happenings are a clear testimony to the extensive preparation[s] that were on. Early in April, after the 6 February fracas, the Police in Kafanchan received a phone call from Anambra State, intimating them of a consignment of arms brought by one Alhaji from Zango and which was on its way to Zango. The caller gave the vehicle number which made it easy for the police to intercept this vehicle which was driven to the Divisional Police Headquarters in Kafanchan. The news soon spread through Kafanchan and individuals trooped to the Police Headquarters and saw things for themselves. After the police were finally briefed by the Powers that be as to the purpose of the arms and were given the appropriate orders, the vehicle was released to one Alhaji Idiya Usman from Zango. Other vehicles arrested by the police with the arms for Zango town included[:] KD 277 TF, KD 9927 AB, KD 202 TF, KD 28 TF and KD 98 TF. These were arrested at different times and dates. Though arrested, their consignments still reached their destination.
6. To further buttress the Hausa preparedness for the war, one Alhaji Mato, an uncle to the Governor of Kaduna State, who was in attendance at the peace meeting chaired by the Deputy Governor, warned the Kataf delegation about the impending doom that was just around the corner for the Kataf. Furthermore, Alhaji Idiya Usman, claimed in front of Justice Cudjoe that the Hausa of Zango required just 3 days to bring the Kataf to their knees. He, of course, knew what he was talking about. In addition to the arms they had successfully smuggled into Zango, they brought in the mercenaries from neighbouring towns and states. Alhaji Idiya was, in fact, leading the weapon training of the Hausas, most of which took place on his farm at Mariri. The last of such training[s] took place on 10 April 1992. During one of such trainings within the vicinity of Zango, an old Hausa woman was shot in the case of mistaken identity. The police were, of course, fully informed of all these happenings.
7. The Hausas had already, in fact, declared war on the Kataf as they continued to kill Kataf people silently. They also continue to institute falsehood through the Government and media which they owned. They taunted the Kataf and talked openly of their invincibility and their powerful connection with Government House where their cousin and nephew was now Governor. For a whole week, they took it upon themselves to destroy large fields of yam seedlings in the surrounding Kataf Villages of Kibori, Ungwar Tabo and Ungwar Rohogo. Domestic animals like pigs were also being killed by Hausa youths. All these were reported to the Police, but their acts were never stopped. On 15 May, when some Kataf men went out to see the destruction which was again wrecked on their farms in the night of the 14th they were attacked by hordes of Hausa "armies" that had apparently laid in wait for them. Quite a number of defenceless Kataf farmers were killed in the attack. This started the Jihad which had on 9 May, been announced by one Aliyu J. Jibrin of the Nigerian Aid Group in a letter he wrote to the Sultan of Sokoto and which was widely copied many supporters of the move. What has now been widely reported variously as the "Kataf Savagery", the "Kataf stone age mentality", the Kataf "Ethnic cleansing", "Katafisation", etc., was the refusal of the Kataf to allow themselves to be mowed by a small group of Hausas who were biting the fingers that had fed them.
8. The Nation was thus very sad, and in some cases, very angry over the loss of life and property in Zango. While sadness is passive, anger, if allowed, can be very expensive and is often regrettable. The first spade of anger ran through Kaduna town, Zaria and Ikara, where hundreds of more lives and property were again lost. In this case, the divide was undeniably along religious lines. At all road blocks, so mounted, you had to recite some Islamic incantations in exchange for your life. Christian Pastors were dragged from the churches and houses, killed and set ablaze. This was another very sad moment for this country. It is, however, now known that, if expressed at all, was expressed by a helpless citizenry and not by the powers that be as such powers were still too occupied with Zangon Kataf, to bother about lives and property in Kaduna, Zaria and Ikara. A rare expression of anger first came from the ever smiling Head of State General Ibrahim Badamasi Babangida, who rushed to Zango Kataf in a most unprecedented manner. He publicly confessed to having watched a film on Zango and this, coupled with what he saw during his visit made him so angry that he made a public declaration which astounded the free world which he claim to belong to. It was decreed that anyone arrested in connection with Zangon Kataf, "was guilty until he proved himself innocent". It was at that same time he indicated Government[']s intention to set up a Tribunal to try people arrested and to compensate fully all people affected.
9. As a people, the Kataf cannot and have not questioned the right of the President of the Federation to promptly visit ethnic and religious trouble spots anywhere in Nigeria, or ignore same elsewhere. We also cannot question his right to set up a Tribunal charged with punishing all arrested people who fail to prove themselves innocent. What we do not know, however, is whether the President knew that only Kataf people would be arrested, even though both sides suffered. We also do not know if the President had been told at the time of the visit that so called reprisals for Zangon Kataf had destroyed lives and property that far out-spanned what happened at Zangon Kataf. We are certain, though, that the President did not mention happenings in Kaduna, Zaria and Ikara during his visit to Zangon Kataf. He just talked of Zango as if other places were not affected.
10. Also, while we maintain that Mr. President had a right to visit Zango, show sadness (because he wept) and anger (because he there and then charged the rules of the game, so as to exact appropriate punishment), we are puzzled that his zeal for justice at Zango is yet to be matched by any other in the History of both Ethnic and Religious disturbances in Nigeria. There are possible reasons for this action. We agree with all Nigerians that such eruptions are bad for the pulse of this country. They therefore, need firm handling. This reason may not pass the test of reasoning because this was not the first of its type during Mr. President's tenure, and yet none received such prompt attention. Some might say, he had to start somewhere. We agree. But it would make no sense if he starts and stops it only in Zango Kataf. We will all recall that the bloody Funtua religious riot which came about 8 months after Zango, is yet to be condemned. There is not, therefore, that determined firmness to stamp out ethnic and religious eruptions. What is it, therefore, in Zango Kataf that made Mr. President come out as a sectional leader? Is it possible that Mr. President was misled? If so, who misled him and why? We will, come to that.
11. After the first hostilities of 6 February in Zango, so much anger was expressed against Kataf by the Kaduna State Government and its agents. We will indicate a few of these to buttress the point. Even though it is a well known fact that the Katafs lost lives and property after that encounter, the Government of Kaduna State sent relief materials to only the Hausas in Zango. The Committee decided to bye-pass the Chairman of the Local Government and the District Head of Zango Kataf and deal directly with the Village Head of Zangon town. A Government Committee found time to call on the Local Government Chairman only to dress him down for his failure to protect the Hausas of Zango. He was there and then threatened with an arrest, not by the police, but by the Committee. Meanwhile, though the District Head and Chairman sent daily security reports to Kaduna, the Government did nothing to forestall later happenings. The same Government was later to deny receiving these reports even though the Chairman and District Head had copies of these reports. Also, to give a dog a bad name so as to hang it, the Government later discovered these reports in their files, but called them "misleading" reports.
12. A number of events before and leading to the clash of 15 May 1992 remained quite puzzling to the Kataf. They make the Kataf wonder how many people had a pre-knowledge of what was coming up in Zango. While the Kataf were led to believe that Government was seriously looking into the problem through [the] Justice Cudjoe Commission, not so the Hausa people. It was when the Commission was sitting that Alhaji Mato, the Governor's uncle, threatened the Kataf. It was also during the Commission's visit to Zango that Alhaji Idiya Usman requested the Commission to sanction a three day war to enable the battle ready Hausas to teach the Kataf, a lesson of their life. It was again while the Commission was seating that the Secretary to the Federal Military Government, on 14 May, rushed to a meeting in the night in his Ungwar Kanawa residence in Kaduna, which was attended by the late Saminu Daura and Rtd. Group Capt. Usman Jibrin. This was the night before the Hausas attacked the Kataf at Zango. It was on 9 May 1992 that one Aliyu I. Jibrin, Secretary to the Nigerian Aid Group in Zango, wrote the Sultan, informing him of the Jihad that was just about starting in Zango. All these indicators neither helped law enforcement agents to forestall trouble not helped them to investigate the role of any Hausa man. We just want to ask again, "How widely known was the planned Zango Jihad among the muslims of Nigeria"?
13. Further exposition might help explain the phenomena. Just before the outbreak of hostilities, Alhaji Kaltungo, who was then the Kaduna Police Commissioner, went on a two week seminar to Jos. The most suitable person to act his position (as if there w[as] no Deputy Commissioner of Police in the State) was a Hausa man who was already an A.I.G., but who would not mind acting a position lower than his - the Late Alhaji Saminu Daura. The reason for his choice became clearer when we learnt that he walked out of security meeting, to protest the use of soldiers to quell the riots in Kaduna. Left to him, a seeming appearance was to be put up by the police (with no orders to shoot), while his Hausa brothers mowed Christians down in Kaduna. Even when he had taken policemen to Zango, it took him hours to order their intervention, because their network believed that the Hausas were dealing with the Kataf appropriately.
14. While the Kataf cannot order the release of the findings of the Cudjoe Commission, we just wonder if its non-release might be connected with damaging report where individuals in Government were discovered to have contributed arms to the Jihad in Zango. We also wonder if Government is concerned in setting up Tribunals and Commissions if the discovery of large quantities of arms (buried in Zango) by the firm reconstructing Zango does not reveal the volume of lies already told about the Kataf leading to their condemnation. We still wonder how much that happened in Zango has been covered up.
15. The Northern Media fell into a campaign of calumny against the Kataf as if they were directed by the powerful Jihadists to lick the wounds of the failed Jihad. While all explanation from the Kataf were censored, every contrived rubbish, as long as it condemned the Kataf, was published or aired. In fact, their situation became so confused that they were not agreed on whether what took place was ethnic or religious. Against the numerous confessions by Hausa residents of Zango that not a single mosque was touched by the Kataf, these media houses reported the destruction of mosques. When any Southern paper reported the truth that no mosque was in fact touched, it was accused of insensibility of Northern interest or of attempts to divide Nigeria. When CAN insisted on the truth, they were accused of having turned the matter into religious. If CAN does not speak against the killing of Rev. Wilson (EKAS Badarawa), Rev. B. B. J. (Baptist Church Unguwar Rimi), Rev. Tachio Duniya (ECWA Tudun Wada) and the destruction of Christian Churches who will?
16. The Media's role includes educating the populace. Can the Northern media beat its chest and claim that it, had met this objective totally? We are quite sure that the public would have loved to know why, after about 300 years of living peacefully together, the Kataf would in a mad rage, attack the Hausa as has been widely reported by them. In fact, the media descended on the Kataf as if they never heard of the small "pious" Hausa lady that walked into a church in the College of Education Kafanchan, in 1987 during a Christian service, took over the microphone from the Pastor and called Muslims to arms against the Christians. They, of course, must be a new breed of news men because they did not seem to know or remember of the lives that were lost in Kano because of a muslim called Maitasine. The Kataf must, of course, have instigated the Hausa in T/Balewa Town to start a fight with the Sayawa, all in Bauchi State. What followed after in Bauchi Town, of course, did not happen. Their smart Editorial Opinion staff were not born when Kano recently went into flames or else lives were not lost. The January 1993 riots in Funtua were so small that only a Kataf man could think that it merits any mention in a Northern media. This phenomenal happening has since been wished away. All these happenings have not, in any way, threatened the corporate existence of this country, only the Kataf had the effrontery.
17. We as a people, have searched for reasons why our "sweet" nation no longer has a little "stand-up" space for the Kataf. No answer will be complete if we do not look at events after the fracas of 15 and 16 May.
18. The Kataf, after having resisted the Jihad, took their wounded and dead to hospitals at Kafanchan and Zonkwa, where the hospital records indicate that they were almost wounded or killed by gun shots. They retrieved their over 30 dead and buried them quietly because they had not been in league with any one and it had been a matter between them and their Hausa neighbours. The police had come in finally and called a truce between them. They, thus waited to see what the police or Government would do about their bone of contention. For the avoidance of doubt, we list below the names of Kataf dead in the Zangon Kataf fracas of 6 February, 15 and 16 May 1992.

NAME	VILLAGE
SHAN SHEKARI	MASHAN ZONZON
JOHN BIRI	MASHAN ZONZON
SAMUEL TABAKWOT	UNG. ROHOGO
BABA YAYOK	RUNJI
ILIYA YABUWAT	GORAN GIDA
DAUDA ZANGO	KIBORI
YARON KASHI	KIBORI
SOFA DANIEL ZWANDIEN	MAGAMIYA
SOLOMON M. AUTA	MAGAMIYA
ISHAYA LAAH	RUNJI
MAKOSHI AVONG	SAKO
BODAM KUKA	ZAMA AWAN
BALA YASHIM	RUNJI
ISHAYA TOKAN	RUNJI
BABA YAHAYA	RUNJI
ISHAKU BULUS	GIDA ZAKI
KAFOI AKUT	GIDA ZAKI
MATHIAS GWAZAH	KURMIN MASARA
CHAAN NKA	KURMIN MASARA
KASAI TUNZWANG	KURMIN MASARA
KAHU MARARAI	KURMIN MASARA
KASAI TOKAN	KURMIN MASARA
DAUDA IBRAHIM	KURMIN MASARA
MALLAM BUHU	KURMIN MASARA
ABUI UMARU	UNG. BORORO
YUSUF ABATAR	KIGUDU
YUSUF AYE	KIGUDU
DANIEL NDEYE	MASHAN
SAMUEL B. YANSHIO	KURFI

Please note that the list does not include those who were mowed down in the fracas in Kaduna, Zaria and Ikara.

1. (19) On the other hand, the Jihadists had reported their losses to their brothers who had contributed arms and money for its execution. Helped by the Police, they evacuated their dead and wounded for displays at Kaduna. Video films were soon flying even outside Nigeria to show the world, particularly the Muslim World, what the small Kataf Tribe, thirsty for "Ethnic Cleansing", had done to the larger Muslim population which was being appealed to for the success of the Jihad. Mosques were used that night to call the "faithfuls" to arms. Again, the special arms that came out were an indication of this preparedness. An unsuspecting Christian population was caught unawares in Kaduna, Zaria and Ikara just as it had been the case in Bauchi, Kano, Funtua and Katsina in the past. Havoc was wrecked on lives and buildings. To worsen the case for the Kataf, Christians resisted this unprovoked attack especially where their numbers were large. They were supposed to have gone into flight while an angry Muslim population chased and killed them like fowls. Even then the Jihad succeeded in its hunt for Christian Religious Leaders who were moved down in their numbers. Even at this, CAN must not and cannot condemn the killing of their Reverends, Pastors and other Church leaders or the deliberate and calculated destruction of Christian Churches by Muslims under the direction of J.N.I. leaders.
2. (20) Since the Jihad failed, and since the Jihad was widely supported by the power that be, vengeance had to be exacted at all costs. A select group of Policemen was quickly put together to "investigate" what happened. Of course, there was no investigation. This is why the Jihadists in Government were careful not to use the Kaduna Police command for this job. On their arrival, the Police were given a list of Kataf Leaders that had been carefully put together. These were invited to a meeting at the Local Government Headquarters at Zonkwa. They believed that Government was interested in not only talking peace, but resolving their long misunderstanding with their Hausa neighbours. These people consisted of the Kataf members of the Deputy Governor's peace committee. They all loyally turned to Kaduna. They were later joined by another Government carefully selected group of Kataf leaders. We can authoritatively inform the public today that no Police investigation took place outside the Government provided list. Also, none of the arrested people was confronted with a charge before he made a statement. Charges were formulated many weeks after such Government selected arrests. The Police were therefore, saved the task of finding the real perpetrators of the Zango fracas. It is also instructive to note here that despite a massive police person presence at Zango on 15 and 16 May which had been testified to by the Hausas, not a single person was arrested on the scene, and none of those later arrested was ever found with a weapon. It is also interesting to note that even though the Police were present at the scene not a single Policeman gave evidence in court implicating any of those who stood trial. Surprisingly, one of the star witnesses, a young Hausa boy age[d] 19 years, claimed before the learned Justices, that he had known the General for 15 years.
3. (21) The simplest Police Investigation, even by recruits of the police force, would have turned up with a list of Hausa people who physically assaulted the Kataf people on 6 February 1992. The same would have happened to reveal those who shot and killed Kataf people on their farms on 15 and 16 May 1992. Even the police diary in Zango/Zonkwa will tell even a dunce the names of Hausa people who were repeatedly reported to the police by the Kataf of various offences the sole purposes of which was to ensure the Jihad took place. It would not take a research to know that Alhaji Danballa ATK, granted an interview to the FRCN, where he assured the nation that blood would flow if the market was moved just days to the fracas. The claims of the invincibility of the Hausas in Zango by both Alhaji Mato and Alhaji Idiya was made in front of Policemen. The open threat of a Jihad by Alhaji I. Jibrin, was copied to the Police. In fact, a signed order by no less a person than the Vice-president himself, for the arrest of some of these people was not only ignored but was explained away by the Governor of Kaduna state as a mistake.
4. (22) Two Tribunals were set up [by] the Federal Military Government to enforce Mr. President's Kafanchan declaration. We thank God that their sittings were public. All the Kataf brought before them had to prove their innocence. It was their words against that of their Hausa neighbours of Zango. It has been said, but we have to repeat, that the Tribunals were a TRAVERSTY OF JUSTICE. They even went beyond this as they become a Mockery of our legal system. For instance, Major-General Zamani Lekwot and six others had completely proved their innocence as the new law required. Their accusers, the prosecution, witnesses, could not even identify some of them in court even though they claimed to have seen and identified them on the scene of the crime. The case against them, thus, collapsed irretrievably. The foolhardy Tribunal now says six of the seven are to hang. We are not aware of any fresh evidence that was introduced, needless to say that, the second time around, evidence was not taken from the accused. The most interesting aspect is that even though they did not speak, the Tribunal found six of them guilty and one of them innocent. Also, Shakarau Kaah and Sani Adam Jankasa were discharged and acquitted by Tribunal 'A', but were condemned by Tribunal 'B'. To make matters worse, the Federal Military Government took swift steps to ensure not only a conviction, but one that would not [be] appealed against. It is now fully known that members of the Federal Supreme Court did not only advise for the promulgation of degree 55 to save themselves from having to listen to the Justice Okadigbo and Adegbite's cases in an appellant status, but some of them even drafted its new form. It is a pity that some of them have been out-lived by the Kataf condemned men. "Alla[h] ba azalumin kowa bane".
5. (23) Back home, the Kaduna State Government and well-meaning philanthropists have had to care for a "very large" population of Hausa refugees situated in so many camps that one losses count. Even the Kaduna State Government, in a rare shameless propaganda, have put the number of refugees from Zango at over 20,000. From the now accepted 1992 census figures, the population of Zango is under 5,000. Various claims have informed the world that over 3,000 of these were killed during the two clashes. What do make of this. Does this confirm the massive importation of mercineries into Zango for the Jihad that failed? Or is this just a Government lie in search for sympathy. Will Nigeria ever know the truth?
6. (24) What justice, therefore, have the Hausa Muslims in Zango Kataf, the Kaduna State Government and the Federal Government been seeking? It will appear that what is being sought for is, "wipe out any Kataf influence in Nigeria". This is why Kataf leaders were selected where a full investigation is carried out to find out which Kataf people killed Hausa people and which Hausa people killed Kataf people, take these to court, no matter their standing in society and be prepared to prove their guilt or innocence from the smallest to the highest court of the land. It is only then that there will be no fear of miscarriage of justice. The police and Government have not cared that over 30 Kataf were killed in Zango. Who will give them justice? We are sure that Mr. President has not been told this. OR HAS HE?
7. (25) We the Kataf people wish to affirm that the Nigerian Constitution confers on us a Nigerian Citizenship. Along with this, comes inalienable rights which unfortunately, have been quite badly contravened in our case. Kataf sons and daughters are daily being thrown out of jobs or denied employment opportunities by both the Kaduna State Government and other agencies.

We believe that the President of Nigeria has been so very badly misled, not only to ostracize a section of his family, but make some of their most patriotic sons scapegoats. This is what all peace lovers on Nigeria have spoken against. The police and other internal security agencies must tell Nigerians the truth about the Zango Kataf crisis.
Long Live Justice.
Long Live The Federal Republic of Nigeria.
We remain your loyal citizens
For the Kataf Community
LIHYAT AKPAT
GWAZA CHOK AKUNAK

== See also ==
- 2019 Kaduna State massacre
- List of massacres in Nigeria
- Mass killings in Southern Kaduna
