= Ashong Ashyui =

Jankasa A̠shong A̠shyui
- Village
- Location within Nigeria
- Coordinates: 09°43′N 08°28′E
- Country: Nigeria
- State: Kaduna State
- LGA: Zangon Kataf
- District: Jei
- Time zone: UTC+01:00 (WAT)
- Postal code: 802141
- Climate: Aw

Ashong Ashyui (Hausa: Jankasa) is a village community in Jei District of Zangon Kataf Local Government Area, southern Kaduna state in the Middle Belt region of Nigeria. The postal code for the village is 802141. The area has an altitude of about 2,798 feet or 852 meters and a population of about 7,837. The nearest airport to the community is the Yakubu Gowon Airport, Jos.

== Health Service ==
In a year 2016, residents of Ashong Ashyui community, a village in Zangon Kataf Local Government Area in southern Kaduna Nigeria was announced have noticed lack of health facility in their community, expressing that they travel 15KM to get access.

They complained of not having a lot of basic infrastructure Eg: lack of schools, lack of portable water, modern farm implements and the most importantly very small facilities to serve large population. Daily Trust Health Desk gathered that one pregnant woman, and three babies have died this year due to the delay in reaching the nearest health facility to the village.

Many pregnant women were said to have given birth on the road to the hospital while some of those who developed complications didn’t make it to the nearest hospital alive.

== Settlements ==
Before 2017, it used to be a district of its own. However, it was later merged with Jei (Unguwar Gaya) district. Among the settlements in this district were:

- Apyia Akamm
- Apyinzwang
- Akputuut
- Ashong Ashyui
- Ashong Ashyui 1
- Ashong Ashyui 2
- Ashong Ashyui 3
- Atyecarak (Attachirak, Kacecere)
- Awak
- Makarau
- Manchong
- Manyi Aminyam
- Manyi Ashyui
- Manta Ason
- Matari
- Nok Ashyui (also Magata, and Afan Tsaai)

== Notable people ==
- Lt. Col. Musa Bityong (late), military officer
- Maj. Gen. Zamani Lekwot (rtd.), military officer
- Hon. Ruth Jummai Ango Former Member, House of Representatives

== Note ==
- Achi, B.; Bitiyonɡ, Y. A.; Bunɡwon, A. D.; Baba, M. Y.; Jim, L. K. N.; Kazah-Toure, M.; Philips, J. E. "A Short History of the Atyap" (2019). Zaria: Tamaza Publishinɡ Co. Ltd. ISBN 978-978-54678-5-7. Pp. 9–245.

== See also ==
- Atyap chiefdom
- List of villages in Kaduna State
