= Sagwaza =

Sagwaza Sagwaza
- Rural
- Location within Nigeria
- Coordinates: 09°56′N 08°18′E
- Country: Nigeria
- State: Kaduna State
- LGA: Zangon Kataf
- District: Kanai, Nigeria
- Time zone: UTC+01:00 (WAT)
- Climate: Aw

Sagwaza (Sagwaza, Tyap: Kanai,) is a Rural community in Kanai District of Zangon Kataf Local Government Area, southern Kaduna state in the Middle Belt region of Nigeria. The postal code for the village is :802139 Sagwaza, Gora Gida in Zangon Kataf, Kaduna.

== Demographics ==
The village consists primarily of the Atyap people.
