= Zonzon =

- District and Village
- Location within Nigeria
- Coordinates: 09°47′N 08°22′E
- Country: Nigeria
- State: Kaduna State
- LGA: Zangon Kataf
- Time zone: UTC+01:00 (WAT)
- Postal code: 802143
- Climate: Aw

Zonzon is a district and a village community in Zangon Kataf Local Government Area, southern Kaduna state in the Middle Belt region of Nigeria. The postal code for the area is 802138.

== Settlements ==
The following are some major settlements in Zonzon district:

- Apyia Babum
- Aza Akat
- Chen Akoo
- Fabwang (T. A̱fabwang, J. Hurbuang, H. Angwan Tabo)
- Kati (H. Wawa-Rafi)
- Mabukhwu
- Makunanshyia
- Makutsatim
- Manyi Sansak
- Mashan, Nigeria
- Masong
- Mawuka
- Mawukili
- Sakum
- Taligan (I, II)
- Zonzon

== Demographics ==
The people of Zonzon district are primarily Atyap people, with settlers from other parts of Nigeria in its major towns.

== Notable people ==
- Engr. Andrew Yakubu Laah, engineer
- Atyoli Bala Achi (late), historian, writer
- Agwam Dominic Gambo Yahaya (KSM), Agwatyap III
- AVM Ishaya Aboi Shekari (rtd.), military officer

== See also ==
- Atyap chiefdom
- Jei District
- Kanai, Nigeria
- List of villages in Kaduna State
