= Atyap Chiefdom =

Atyap Chiefdom A̱byin-tyok A̱tyap
- Traditional state
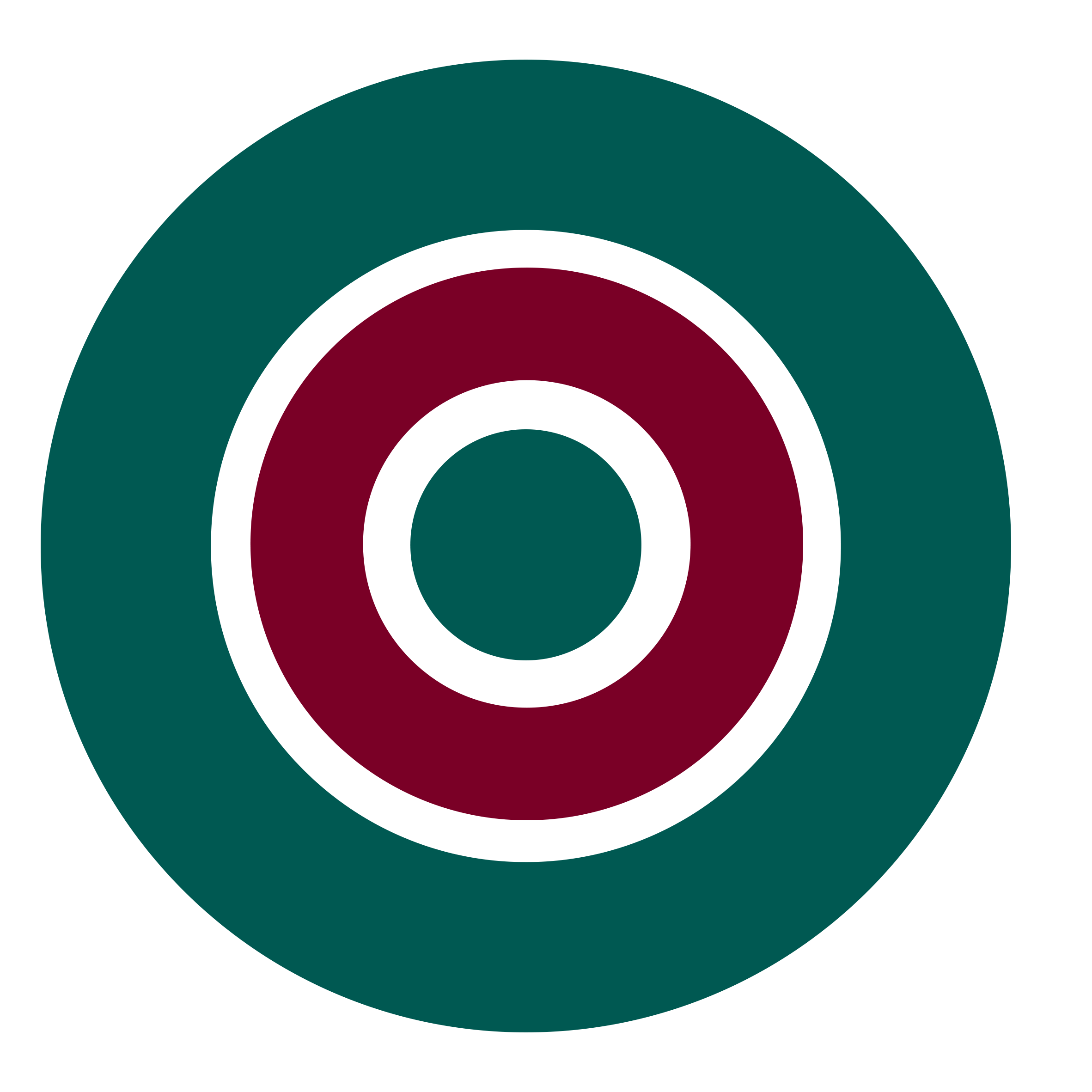
- Atyap ensign (Tyap: A̱sa̱khwot a̱ghyi A̱tyap ba)

- Location in Nigeria
- Coordinates: 9°49′N 8°22′E
- Country: Nigeria
- State: Kaduna State
- LGA: Zangon Kataf
- Chiefdom: Atyap

Government
  - Type: Elective monarchy
  - A̠gwatyap: A̠gwam Dominic Gambo Yahaya (KSM)

Atyap Chiefdom is a Nigerian traditional state of the Atyap people, located on the upper Kaduna River basin of the central Nigeria plateau in the Middle Belt. Its headquarters is at A̠tak Njei, Zangon Kataf, southern Kaduna state, Nigeria.

== People ==
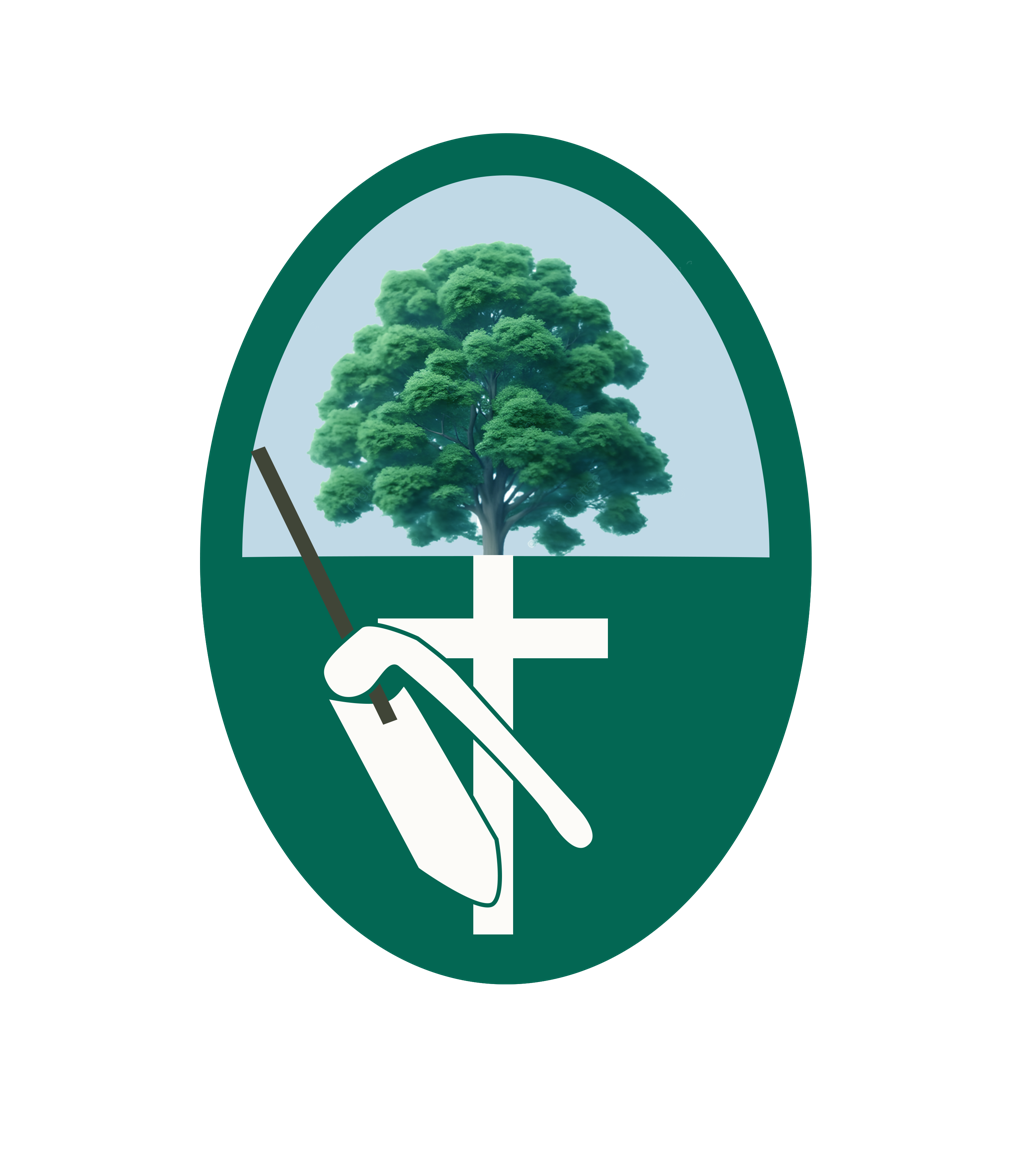
Atyap emblem

The dominant people group in the Chiefdom are the native Atyap people.

== History ==
The Atyap Chiefdom was created in 1995. In 2007, it was upɡraded to a First Class status.

== Government ==
The Atyap Chiefdom is run by the Atyap Traditional Council, with the A̠gwatyap as its head.

== Administrative divisions ==
=== Districts ===
The Kaduna state Ministry of Local Government Affairs gave its number of Existing Districts as 16, Approved Districts as five and Approved Village Units as 61.

These are the districts between 1995 and 2017:

| S/N | Tyap indigenous name | Hausa exogenous name |
|---|---|---|
| 1 | A̠buyap | Ungwar Rohogo |
| 2 | Á̠nietcen-A̱fakan | Zangon Urban |
| 3 | A̠shong A̠shyui | Jankasa |
| 4 | Bafoi Ka̠nai | Gora Bafai |
| 5 | Cen-A̠koo; also Zama A̠won | |
| 6 | Gan Ka̠nai | Gora Gan |
| 7 | Jei (Chiefdom Head district) | Unɡwar Gaiya |
| 8 | Ka̠nai Mali; also A̠tsung A̠byek | Gora Gida |
| 9 | Makomurum | Kibori |
| 10 | Mancong | Magadan Wuka |
| 11 | Mazaki | Gidan Zaki |
| 12 | Manyii-Aghyui | Kigudu, Bakin Kogi |
| 13 | Sop-A̠koo | Mabushi Kataf |
| 14 | Shilyam, also Kwakhwu | |
| 15 | Taligan (A̠takligan), also A̠ga̠mi | Magamiya |
| 16 | Zonzon | Zonzon Gora |

However, these are the current five Government-Approved Districts from 2017 onwards, trimmed down by the incumbent Kaduna State governor Nasir Elrufai who accordingly said, as reported by Premium Times, Nigeria that the committee set up to address the district administration in the state concluded that the proliferation of the number of districts from the pre-2001 era had created a financial burden for Local Government Councils. Hence, their reversal back to the pre-2001 era. Viz:

| S/N | Tyap indigenous name | Hausa exogenous name |
|---|---|---|
| 1 | Á̠nietcen-A̱fakan | Zangon Urban |
| 2 | Jei (Chiefdom Head-district) | Ungwar Gaiya |
| 3 | Ka̠nai | Gora |
| 4 | Zonzon | Ungwan Wakily |

=== Headquarters ===
The headquarters of the Atyap Chiefdom is Atak Njei, where the Agwatyap's palace (Tyap: Magwatyap) is located.

Of recent, there had been moves by the Nasir el-Rufai-led Kaduna State government to question the locating of the palace in that very region located at the outskirts of the Hausa-Fulani-Kanuri dominated town of Zangon Kataf (Tyap: Á̠nietcen-A̱fakan), a move which has strongly been countered by the Atyap Community Development Association (ACDA).

== Rulership ==
=== Royal houses ===
Atyap Chiefdom consists of four royal houses divided according to the four clans of the Atyap people, namely:

| S/N | Clan | Subclan |
|---|---|---|
| 1 | A̠gbaat | • A̠kpaisa • Jei • A̠kwak |
| 2 | A̠minyam | • A̠fakan • A̠son |
| 3 | A̠ku | |
| 4 | A̠shokwa | |

=== Rulers ===
The ruling monarchs of the Atyap Chiefdom are known as A̠gwatyap.

The word is derived from these two Tyap words: a̱gwam (i.e. a monarch) and A̱tyap (i.e. after the Atyap people) and literally means "monarch of the Atyap".

=== List of rulers ===
The names of these rulers who reigned from 1995 till date are as follows:

| Start | End | Ruler |
|---|---|---|
| 1995 | 2005 | HRH A̠gwam Ba̠la A̠de Da̠uke (JP), Agwatyap I |
| 2005 | April 6, 2016 | HRH A̱gwam Dr. Harrison Yusuf Bunggwon (FNSE), A̠gwatyap II |
| November 12, 2016 | Date | HRH A̱gwam Dominic Gambo Yahaya (KSM), Agwatyap III |

== See also ==
- Abwoi religion
- Ayet Atyap annual cultural festival
- Southern Kaduna
- The 1992 Zangon Kataf crises
