= Zamani Lekwot =

Nigerian Army major general (born 1944)

Major General Zamani Lekwot
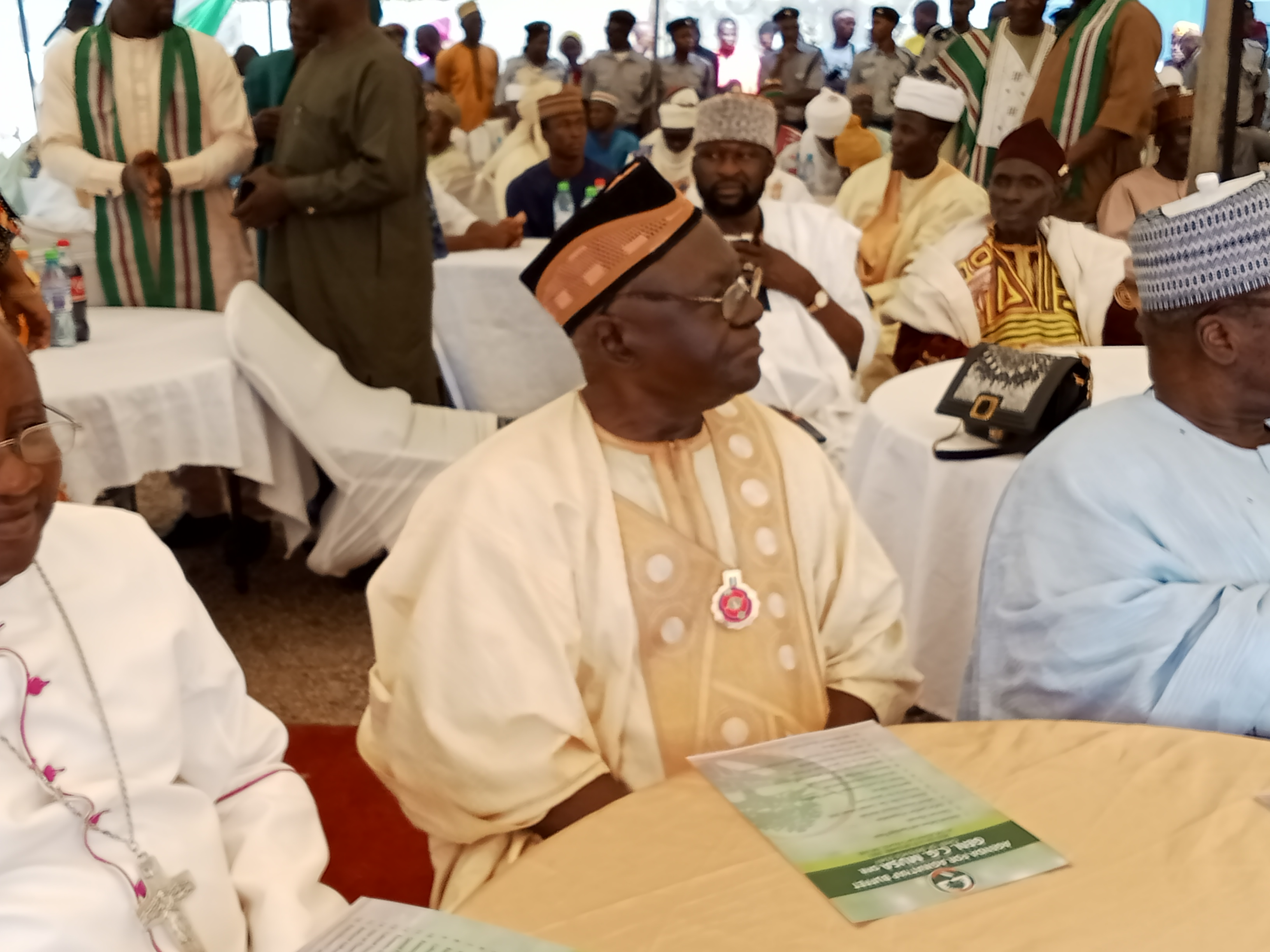
- Lekwot in 2023

Military Governor of Rivers State
- In office July 1975 – July 1978
- Preceded by: Alfred Diete-Spiff
- Succeeded by: Suleiman Saidu

Commandant of the Nigerian Defence Academy
- In office July 1979 – 1982
- Preceded by: Brig Joseph Garba
- Succeeded by: Brig Abdullahi Shelleng

Personal details
- Born: 19 July 1944 (age 82) Ashong Ashyui, Northern Region, British Nigeria (now Ashong Ashyui (Jankasa), Nigeria)
- Education: Nigerian Military School; NMTC; Indian Military Academy

Military service
- Allegiance: Nigeria
- Branch/service: Nigerian Army
- Years of service: 1966-1985
- Rank: Major General
- Battles/wars: Nigerian Civil War

Zamani Lekwot (born 19 July 1944) is a retired Nigerian Army major general who served as the military governor of Rivers State, Nigeria from July 1975 until July 1978 during the military administrations of Generals Murtala Muhammed and Olusegun Obasanjo.

== Early life ==
Lekwot was born in 1944 to Atyap parents in Ashong Ashyui, Northern Region (now in southern Kaduna State), Nigeria.

== Military career ==
Lekwot attended the prestigious Nigerian Military School for his secondary education before he entered the army on 11 July 1962, and attended the Nigerian Military Training College, Kaduna and the Indian Military Academy, gaining his commission on 14 July 1966.

He was a company commander in the 6th Battalion when it took part in the battle that caused the fall of Bonny on 26/27 July 1967 during the Nigerian Civil War.

He was the Commander, 33 Infantry Brigade, Maiduguri in 1975 before he assumed the Military Governorship of Rivers State.

During his military career, Lekwot also served as Commandant of the Nigeria Defence Academy, General Officer Commanding 82 Composite Division, Nigerian Army and Ambassador/High Commissioner to the Republics of Senegal, Mauritania, Cape Verde and the Gambia.

The 2 Brigade Nigerian Army Barracks in Port Harcourt, Rivers State was named the Zamani Lekwot cantonment in his honor. In August 2003 it was renamed the Port Harcourt Barracks.

Lekwot fell out with General Ibrahim Babangida after Babangida became Chief of Staff following the military coup of 31 December 1983 that brought General Muhammadu Buhari to power. He was forced to retire on 31 December 1985 when Babangida was the Head-of-State.

== Later career ==
On 15 May 1992 violence erupted between the mainly Moslem Hausa and mainly Christian Atyap communities of the Zangon-Kataf Local Government Area in Kaduna State over trading and land ownership rights, with many deaths. A tribunal set up by the Babangida government sentenced Lekwot and 16 others to death for alleged complicity in the killings, sentences eventually reduced to a short jail sentence. It was said that his sentence was due to his feud with Babangida.

He was assisted in his prolonged battle to avoid execution by Barr. (Col.) Yohanna A. Madaki.

By December 1995, Lekwot had received a state pardon.

In June 2003 he was Chairman of Giza Ventures Nigeria and a Director of Prudent bank.

== Chieftaincy ==
Lekwot was in January 2014 honoured by the Agwatyap, the traditional ruler of Atyap Chiefdom, Engr. Dr. Harrison Y. Bungwon, with the title, "Agwabyin" meaning "Guardian of the land".
