= Abwoi religion =

Religion of central Nigeria

Abwoi
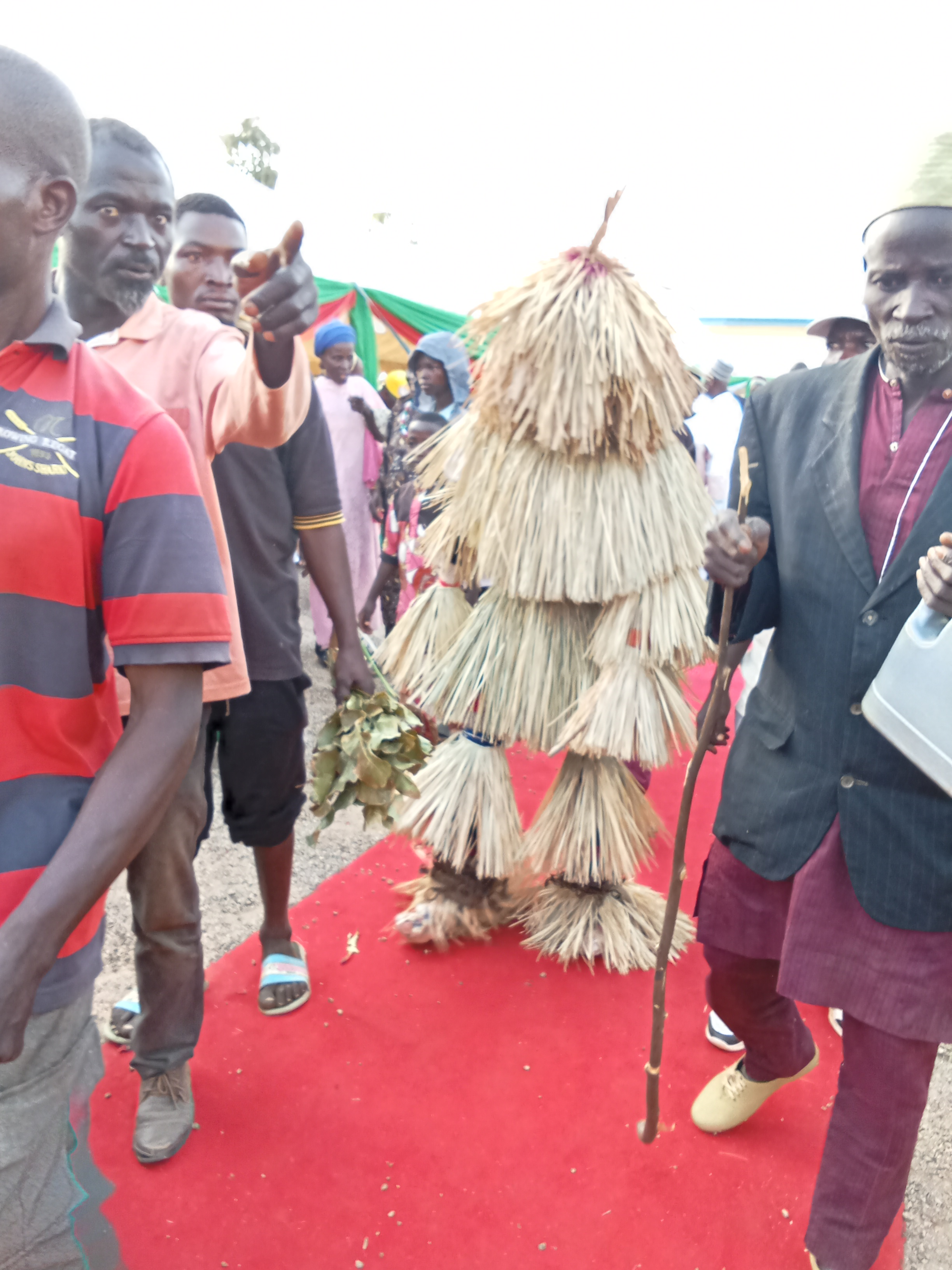
- Akursak, the 'lesser' Abwoi
- Type: African
- Classification: West African
- Structure: Secret fraternal society
- Origin: unknown Central Nigeria
- Other names: Abvwoi (Abvoi), Nezhen, Ku

Abwoi (Tyap ("proper", "Mabatado"): A̠bwoi, A̠boi. Variant spelling: Obwoi; (Gworok): A̠bvwoi, A̠bvoi; Jju: A̠bvwoi, A̠bvoi; Hyam: Ku, Buboi, Bomboin; Kyoli: Amboyinye; Nghan: Nezhen; Ibishi: Ugurza, Hausa: Dodo, Yoruba: Juju) is an African traditional religion institution which operated more like a cult of male ancestral spirits viewed as ghosts or reincarnations of the dead, whose physical forms remained invisible but voices audible, with origins among the central Nigeria plateau or Nenzit peoples such as the Adara, Atyap, Bajju, Bakulu, Batinor, Ham, Irigwe and others.

Adherents were required to participate in frequent rituals within the year and a general communal worship once in a year, during which the oracles speak on sensitive issues concerning the community.

== Origins ==
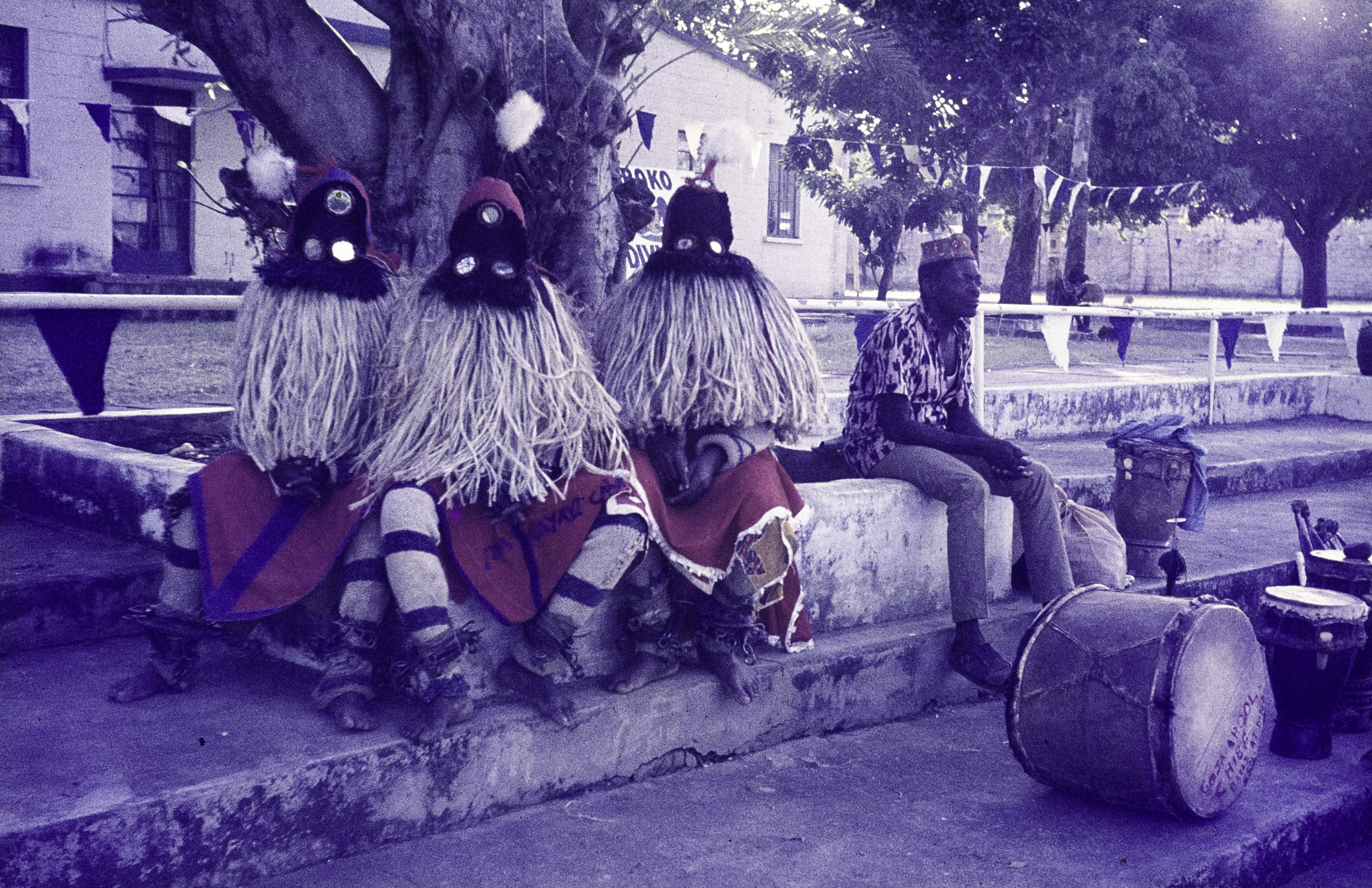
Three men dressed as Abwoi (dodo) at the beginning of a ritual, with a drummer as they await their turn. Jos, 1970–1973.

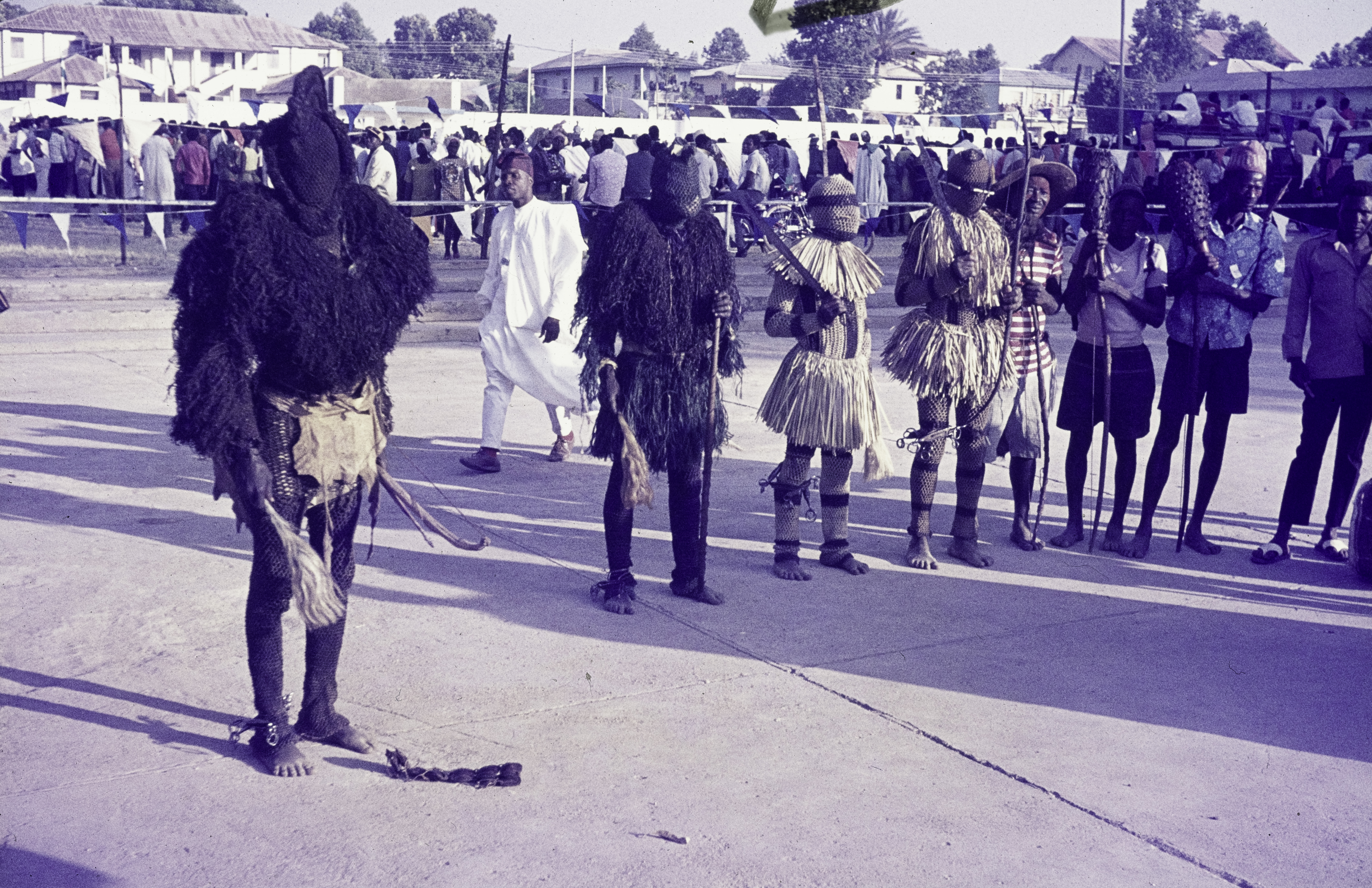
Four Abwoi (dodo) men with clinking anklets and three musicians with mouth bows and calabash rattles, surrounded by a network of rattles. Jos, 1970–1973.

There seem to be no unifying tradition of origin on this religion. In other words, this suggests that the Abwoi cult is an ancient religion.

=== Nenzit ===
==== Atyap ====
A tradition among the Atyap ("Mabatado") suggests that the Aku clan credited as the first settlers in the land who came out from the ground at the arrival of the Atyap hunters were the originators of Abwoi among that Atyap (Nenzit) sub-group, with some of the latter Abwoi types being of Atsam and Agworok origins.

Atuk (March 2008: 30–33) noted that the idea of the Atyap religion (the Abwoi cult) was introduced by the Anghan, courtesy of the oral history narrated by an informant, Atyoli Abwui Kato, who narrated that:

The Anghan people came to Kanai or Sanai or Bafoi Kanai to mourn the death of their indigene - Kura Yanga, a woman in Atyap land. As is the custom of the Anghan, such burial ceremonies are often accompanied with an Abwoi ceremony. The indigenes of Bafoi asked the Anghan to leave behind the Abwoi with them, which they came with. After they agreed, a small ritual of two goats and some ingredients and wine were performed.

According to Atuk, this information sounds accurate as the genealogy of the woman in question has been found, furthering that Tokan Bukhwu was the first priest or a̠gwam a̠bwoi, followed by Baghai Tokan.

==== Bajju ====
One of the traditional narratives in the Bajju area goes that the cult came from the village Tsoriyang of the Bayinhwan clan eight miles away from Zonkwa. Another claims that a man named Tawai brought it from the Irigwe country. A third claims it was of Ham origin.

==== Gwong ====
Among the Gwong, a tradition claims that the cult began in a village called Agabi and started only of recent, probably in the 19th century.

=== Other ===
A Gbagyi origin was suggested by Gunn (1956:79) for the cult's existence in the Southern Kaduna area, based on his "linguistical evidence" in which he presented that the Gbagyi word for 'calabash' or 'gourd' is 'obwe'/'obvwe'. However, Isichei (1988:46) differed in view, stating that there was no mention of any cult called 'Abvwoi' (or 'Abwoi') from any available oral data of the Gbagyi. Alternatively, Gunn suggested that the cult was 'borrowed' from the Adara via the Bakulu.

== Practices ==
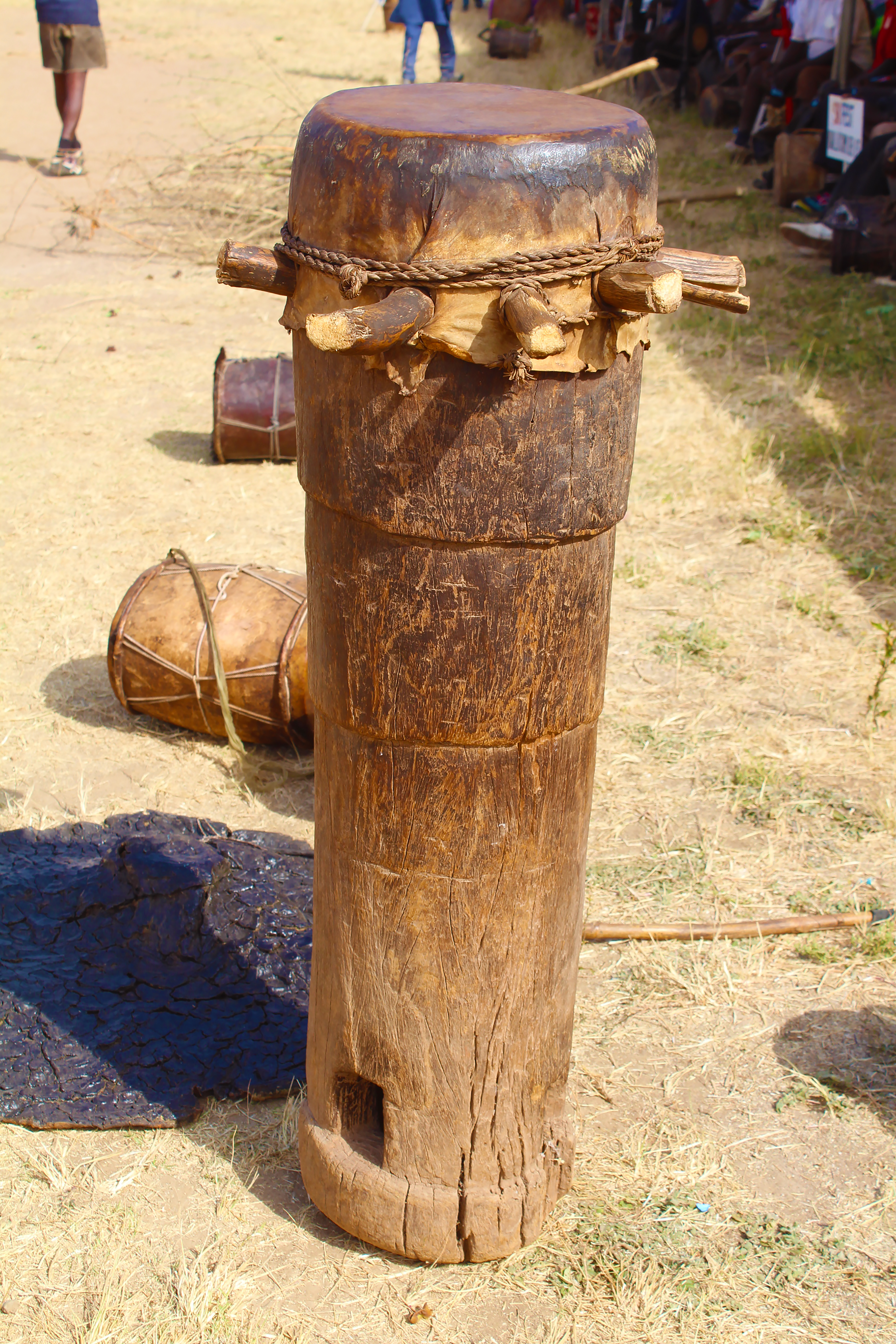
A long drum (Jju: a̠gatak, Tyap: a̱di̱ri̱m) in the Abwoi religion

In the ancient practice, women were barred from entering the shrine or dancing during ceremonies organized by the Abwoi. It was an all-men affair, i.e., only men were allowed, and all adult men in each village belonged to the local Abwoi lodge after their initiation.

In the Atyap ("Mabatado") area, the Abwoi had a number of festivities, but the Ayet festival or Atyap Traditional New Year festival was the grandest. During the Ayet period, no man or woman was expected to spank a child. Any offender was made to pay a fine of two goats. Deaths, weddings, and pounding at night were also viewed as bad omen during this period, and women who pounded at night were accused of pounding on their children's heads by the Abwoi and were fined.

During a communal annual ceremonial gathering, which usually lasted for a week, a whole community brings offerings of a̠kan or dikan in Jju (beer), cwan (beniseed), zón or bvon in Jju (goats), nywán (fowls), and a̠ka̠ti (a semi-liquid delicacy made of coarse crushed corn grain particles and vegetables) to the Tutu A̠bwoi (Gworok: Tu A̠bvwoi; Jju: A̠buje A̠bvwoi; English: Abwoi shrine). The shrine was large enough to accommodate 40 people at once. It was traditionally made circular in contrast to the normal houses, which were oval-shaped. The shrine housed the paraphernalia of the Abwoi.

The Agwam Abwoi (chief priest) afterwards sips some of the beer from the a̠sum (small pot) and asks for a good agricultural year or season from the ancestors. Older initiated men usually went into the shrine, while the younger boys and women stayed beneath a shade such as a large tree, while the ceremony commence. As at when dancing begins, the loud resonating voices of the Abwoi is heard from the concealed roof of the shrine disguised by the use of a two-ended large gourd, covered with spider's egg capsule.

== Initiation ==
The exact general age of initiation is uncertain but the average age is about 10 years. Among the Fantswam, male children were taken to the Abwoi shrine at an early age of between four and eight years.

The young boys were kept for five days and warned to be obedient to their parents, obey the rule of law, and to keep the cult's secrets and told the consequence of revealing those secrets. They were also not allowed to leave the shrine; toilet facilities were made available in the shrine together with food and water. They also received serious beating within the period and told if any reveals the cult's secrets to women, such would be killed and the corpse dragged into the forest.

Afterwards, a short ceremony follows and they were taken to the stream or river for a form of baptism, with their heads smeared with a̠myia̠koo (mahogany oil). They were later handed over to their mothers at the shrine who welcomed and cleaned them up, as it was claimed that they were eaten off and vomited again by the Abwoi. The whole village then throws a feast for them.

=== Significance of the initiation ===
The initiation by 'swallowing and vomiting' signified the graduating of the male children into manhood, introducing them into the cult, and also remind them of the consequence of revealing the common secret. In his words, Atuk writes:

"It's clear that the rites symbolize a process of death and rebirth. The five days of silence (the period of their stay in the Abwoi shrine) is a portrayal of the early years of children who have not yet learned to speak."

=== Consequences of revealing Abwoi secrets ===
Any amongst the initiated boys who would reveal the truth about the Abwoi cult would be taken back to the shrine and tried. If found guilty, his father would rub ashes on him (the symbol of mourning). Henceforth, that child would be impaled on a sharpened stake (a form of execution used by the Abwoi) and all the initiated would begin to sing and dance around to drown the screams of the victim. The women would hence be told that the boy had been 'swallowed' by the Abwoi.

== Secret of the Abwoi ==
The common secret of the Abwoi among the Nenzit sub-groups (Atyap, Bajju, Agworok) was the disguise of the voice of the Abwoi by the use of a mechanism that makes it sound like the voice of the spirit of a dead ancestor. The device was crafted with the gourd of a snuff-box tree (oncoba spinosa; Hausa: Kukan ciki) by taking out the seeds from it and two holes borne on its opposite sides. One side was then connect to a bamboo stem and the other side of the gourd muffled with the webs of a spider to give a special sound effect. The disguised voices come from both the main Abwoi speaker and from others in the shrine.

== Types and offices of the Abwoi ==
=== Types ===
There were several types of Abwoi, each with its peculiar duties. These include:

1. Li̠m (Jju: Zabyya̠; variant spelling: Zabieh): The most dreaded and terrifyinɡ of all the Abwoi. It was responsible for 'swallows' and 'voming' children during and after the initiation ceremony. Its cry made the ɡround trembled 'like an earthquake'. It had a gigantic appearance.
2. A̠bansop or Bansop; variant spelling: Bansip (Jju: Aninyet; variant name: Daniet): This also had a ɡigantic appearance and looked like a forest due to its reɡalia being complete leaves from head down to the feet. It was usually confined around forested environments. It is made with bamboo frame covered with leaves and goes about at night.
3. Mapyia̠ (variant spellings: Mapio, Mapie, Mupie): This was sometimes reɡarded as A̠yang A̠bwoi (mother A̠bwoi). It did appear and cried in the niɡht to friɡhten and scare the errinɡ people especially, thieves. It was found mostly around streams. It is thought to be a male Abwoi which produces a feminine sound by ululation.
4. A̠bwoi A̠gwoot: This was said to have been imported from Gworok (H. Kagoro). Its duty was mainly to watch over all theft scenarios in maize farms. Females were not involved in this very Abwoi practice, except initiation males.
5. Dankwari (Jju: Dankpari; variant spelling: Dangpari): This Abwoi was practiced mostly at night and involved two or more people, scattered around. When the one (the female) produced a sound wilily repeatedly, the other (the male) would respond with a hoarse humming voice, moving simultaneously. It was usually heard after harvest.
6. A̠kursak (Jju: A̠kusak): The Kursak was an emissary of the Abwoi. It was earlier clothed with grasses, then leaves and recently with a colourful raffia costume. The Atyap's Kursak's crest or headpiece is more elaborate than the Bajju's Kusak's crest, but other features are more or less same.
7. Alewa: This is a version of Kursak found among the Agworok, which speaks unlike the other Kursak which is mute. It usually appears in festivals, at the deaths of elders and during epidemics.
8. Mbwoi (variant spelling: Mboi, Mbue): This was a visible masked spirit introduced in Gworok (Kagoro) in 1930 by the Ankwai in response to the wickedness of the then paramount ruler, Mugunta Atin. It was banned in 1933 by the British colonial government due to its violent tendencies.

=== Offices ===
At the top was the office of the chief priest of the A̠bwoi cult, known as the A̠gwam A̠bwoi (H. Magajin Dodo) and there was the A̠byii̠k A̠bwoi (wife of Abwoi) who was the Byia̱k A̠bwoi (H. Madaucin Dodo) whose duty was the interpretation of the A̠bwoi's messaɡes.

There were as well the Mman Tutu A̠bwoi (children of A̠bwoi's shrine) who numbered between 10 and 25, whose main duty was to answer the A̠bwoi's sonɡ.

There was the office of A̠gwam A̠nyiuk A̠bwoi (H. Magajiyan Matan Dodo; E. Abwoi Women Leader).

Also, there were the Tswá Ywan, the orɡanizers of the various A̠bwoi feasts who supervised the compulsory brewinɡ of a̠kan or dikan (beer/liquor) by the women.

== Akursak (The lesser Abwoi) ==
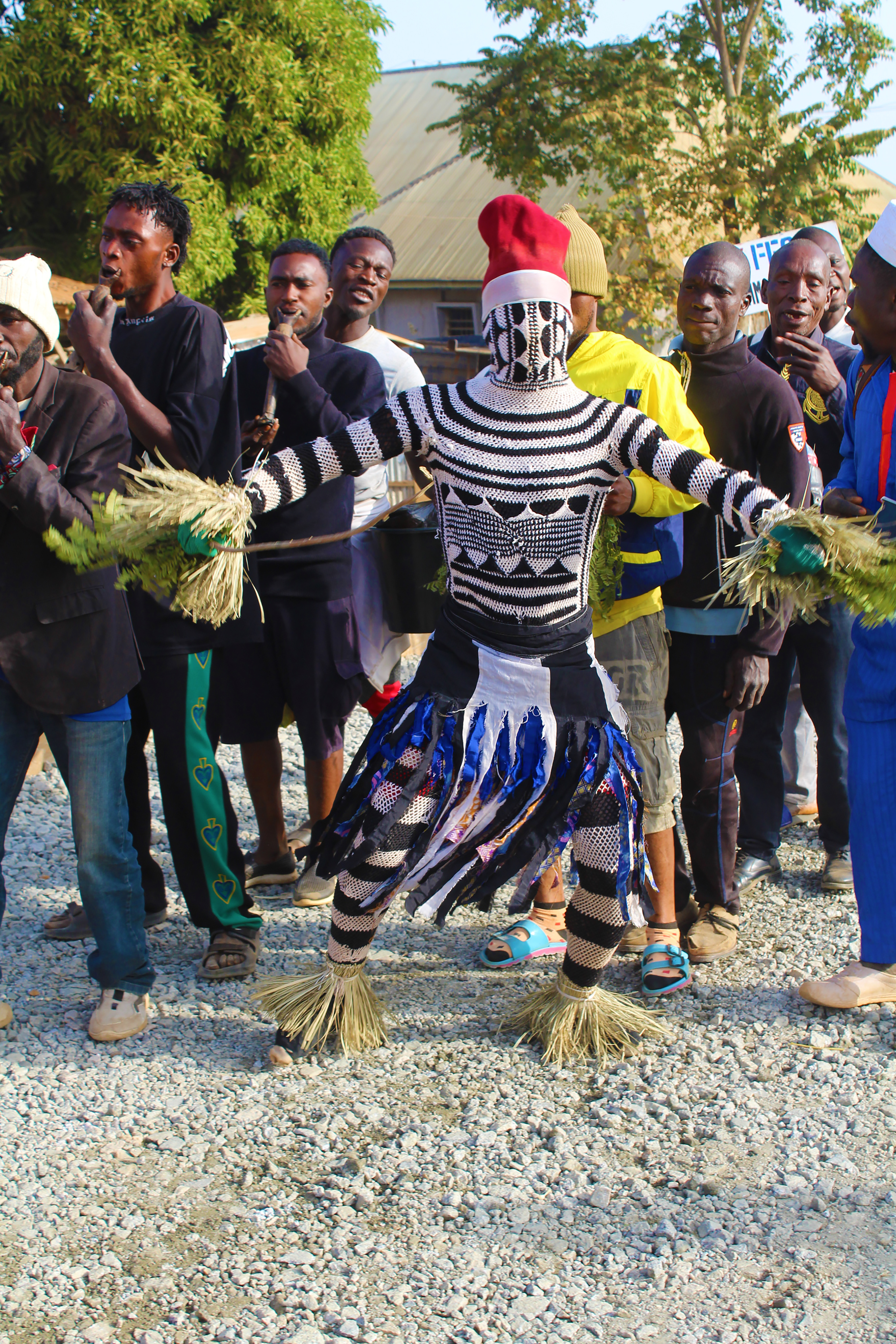
Gigira (Gyong); Kunghira (Kyoli)

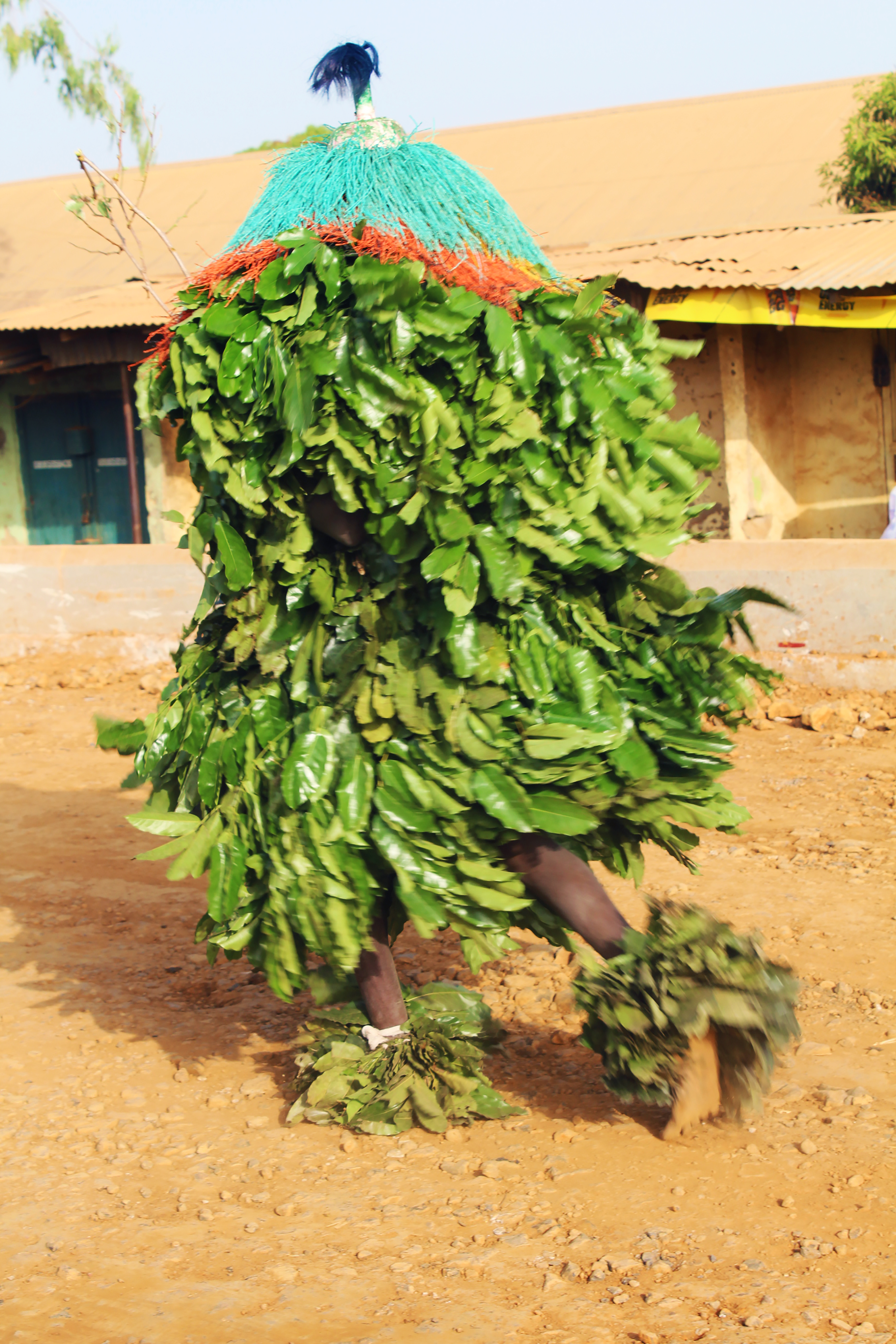
Nangbozhi (Hyam)

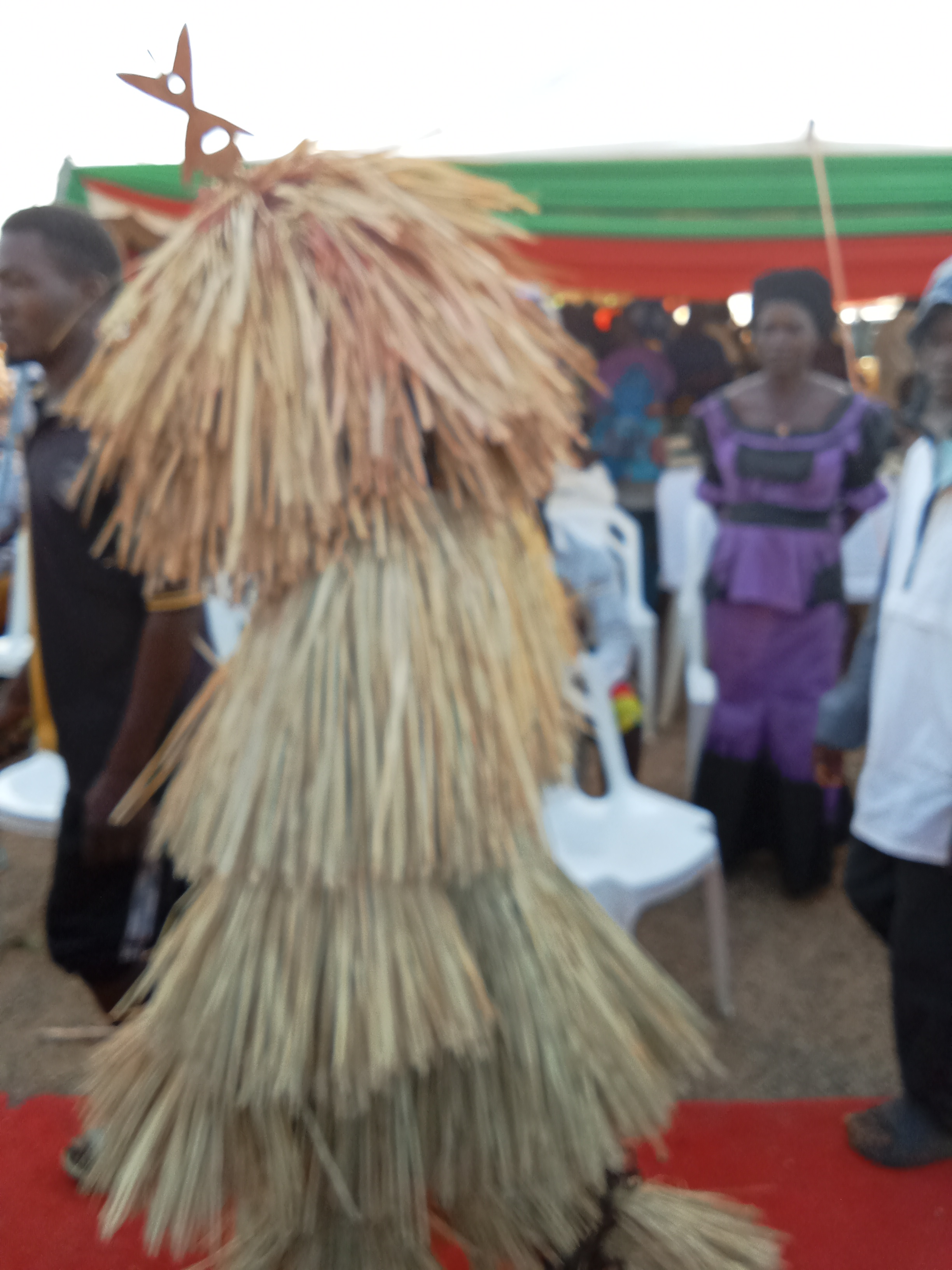
Akursak (Tyap), Akusak (Jju)

The advent of lesser Abwoi called A̠kursak, Kursak in Tyap or A̠kusak, Kusak in Jju, was a sort of 'good news' to the women who were for the first time allowed to go into the shrine with men. The Kursak was said to have been introduced in Atyapland by the Batinor (Koro) people. It is normally a masked person (masquerade) who dances to the delight of the on-lookers, with his attire consisting of beautifully selected colours and woven in such a way that there are little air-spaces but no skin could be seen from outside. With the advent of the Kursak and with its attendant demands, women started composing songs to match with its dancing steps. The Kursak does not dance alone but specifically with a girl (not a woman). With him always is his "personal attendant" who continually sprays on him liquor, said to freshen him, being that his attire does not have adequate airspaces which would have allowed for easy breathing, according to Atyoli Nanam Kuje, an interviewee of Atuk's.

=== Rules ===
The worshippers (mainly men) were instructed to keep away from women during ceremonial periods. This rule was compulsory especially for him who is to be made a Kursak. It was believed that if the person isn't clean, when in the Kursak attire, the attire will eat deep into his flesh. Due to this, worshippers were advised to look clean both in body and in spirit.

A lot of taboos abound in the Abwoi shrine, which worshippers were expected to keep sacred without violation. One of such is: While in the shrine, no worshipper was allowed to eat food or drink wine without the permit of the a̠gwam a̠bwoi (Abwoi chief priest). The priest himself was as a matter of fact the disher of such things. Any worshipper who does contrary to those simple rules is bound to be expelled, since he would be regarded as a "sinner".

The Abwoi practiced and imposed capital punishments on its erring members. A capital punishment usually goes to any member who reveals to his wife what the Abwoi is and what it looks like. It is interesting to note that the communication which transpired between a husband and his wife is known in the Abwoi's shrine. Investigation made it known that this was not an omnipresent attribute that could be associated with the Abwoi, but that the Abwoi had a complex network of spies and informants even among women. They knew women to be more talkative, hence, they cannot keep secrets, and they were bound to be heard. Once an initiated member violates the rule, the punishment was a capital one.

== Societal and social functions of the Abwoi ==
In an oral interview with Atyoli K. Nka, conducted by Atuk, the Abwoi were also said to be worshipped as demi-gods by the people due to their proximity to them than the real Heavenly Father, Agwaza (Jju: Ka̠za; Hyam: Nom). The Abwoi were said to have provided the people food and were capable of summoning them at odd times, especially in times of crises, to warn them about certain things; and also wielded supernatural powers used to heal the sick, especially children taken to them and make barren women conceive, hence, viewed as being "omnipotent".

The Abwoi legislated by instituting strong laws and orders, as well as police the community to strictly implement them.

In general, the A̠bwoi new farming year festival (T. Sonɡ A̠bwoi; J. Song A̠bvwoi) was held at the beginning of each rainy season at the end of April. It was a period when all the A̠bwoi were escorted to unknown destinations, farming activities commenced immediately. After their temporal exit, no sound of the A̠bwoi cry was heard. Nevertheless, it was unusual when cry of the A̠bwoi was heard at this time and may be viewed as a cry of a bad omen such as rampant cases of witchcraft or wizardry, outbreak of smallpox and other epidemics, natural disasters such as drought, flood, locust invasion, and so on. When such an unusual cry of the A̠bwoi was heard, the A̠gwam A̠bwoi (H. Maɡajin Dodo) does lead other elders to the A̠bwoi shrine where the A̠bwoi were called upon to tell the people why they cried. After which the people were warned to desist from their bad ways if that was the cause.

== See also ==
- Ekpe
- Juju
- Ogboni
