= Grace Garba =

First Nigerian woman to be highest ranking NCO

- Born: February 14, 1966 (age 60); Garkida, Adamawa State, Nigeria
- Citizenship: Nigerian
- Education: Nursing, School of Nursing, Maiduguri; Midwifery, Ahmadu Bello University Teaching Hospital, Zaria; Certificate in Public Health, School of Health Technology, Kaduna; Advanced Diploma in Public Administration, Federal University of Technology, Yola
- Occupations: Air Warrant Officer, Nurse
- Known for: First female Senior Non-Commissioned Officer promoted to the highest rank in the Nigerian Air Force (2019)

Grace Garba is the first female Senior Non-Commissioned Officer (SNCO) to be promoted to the highest rank in the Non-Commissioned Officers’ cadre since Nigerian Air Force was established on April 18, 1964.

== Early life and education ==
Grace Garba was born on February 14, 1966, in Garkida, Gombi Local Government Area of Adamawa State. She joined the Nigerian Air Force in 1986 as a member of Basic Military Training Course (BMTC) 10.

While in the service, she studied and earned four certificates namely a degree in nursing from the School of Nursing, Maiduguri, Borno State, Nigeria; a midwifery certificate from Ahmadu Bello University Teaching Hospital Zaria, Kaduna State, Nigeria; a certificate in Public Health from the School of Health Technology, Kaduna State, Nigeria and an Advanced Diploma in Public Administration certificate from the Federal University of Technology, Yola, Adamawa State, Nigeria.

== Career ==
Garba was posted as the regimental sergeant major (RSM) at the Nigerian Air Force School of Medical Sciences and Aviation Medicine (NAFSMSAM) Kaduna State. She was serving in this position before her promotion to the post of Air Warrant Officer. AWO Grace Garba was decorated with her new rank on October 15, 2019, at the Nigerian Air Force Headquarters Abuja Nigeria. The Chief of Air Staff, Air Marshal Sadique Abubakar and the Minister of Women Affairs and Social Development, Dame Pauline Tallen decorated her with her new post. With her promotion, she became the first female Senior Non-Commissioned Officer (SNCO) to be promoted to the highest rank in the Non-Commissioned Officers’ cadre since Nigerian Air Force was established on April 18, 1964.

== See also ==
- Blessing Liman
