= Nuhu Bamalli Polytechnic =

Academic institution in Zaria Kaduna State, Nigeria

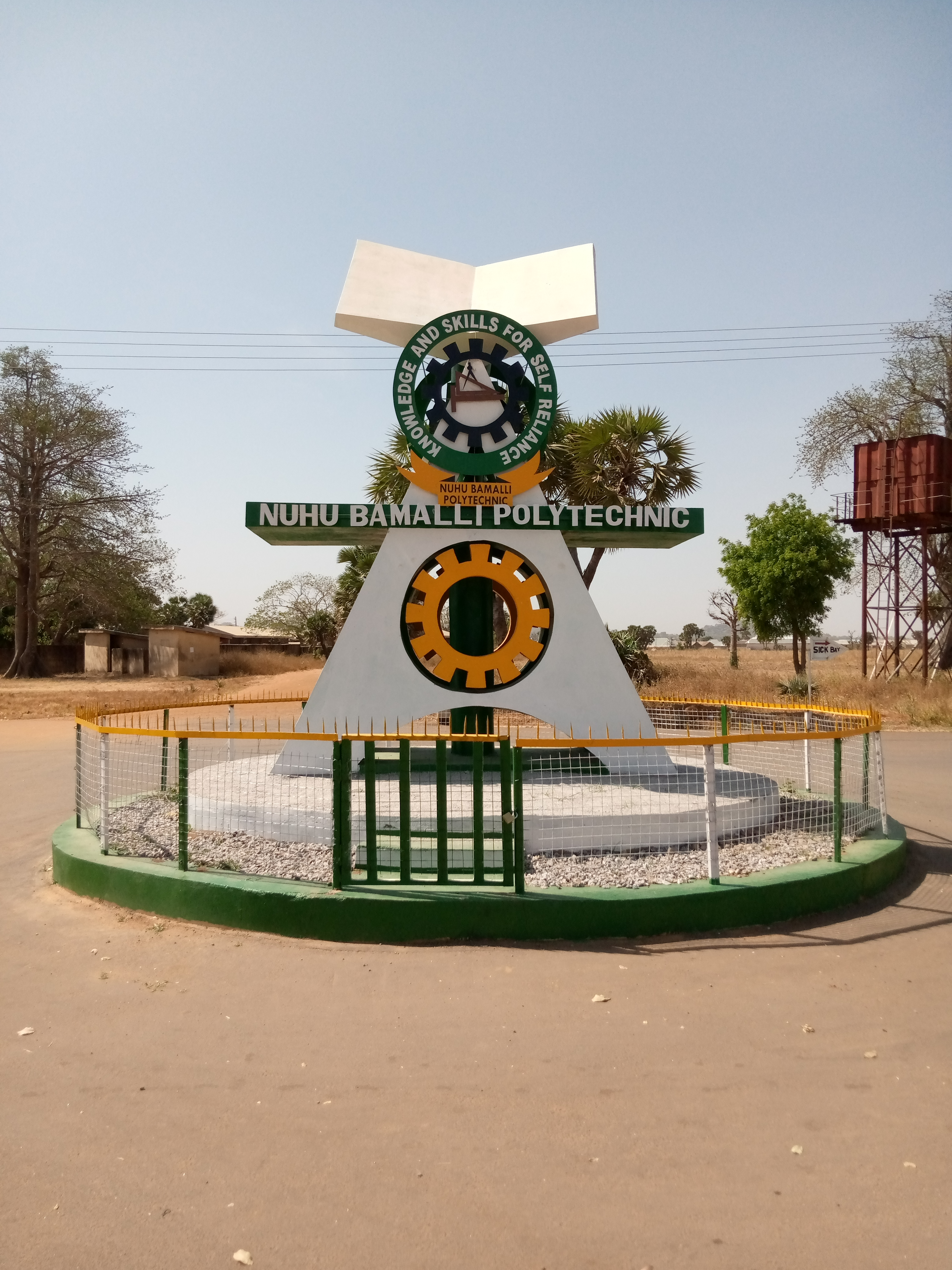
- Motto: Knowledge And Skills For Self Reliance
- Type: Public
- Established: 1989
- Rector: Dr Mohammed Kabir Abdullahi
- Students: 9,000 (2016)
- Location: (Nigeria) Zaria, Samaru Kataf, Kaduna State, Nigeria
- Campus: Rural
- Website: www.nubapoly.edu.ng

Nuhu Bamalli Polytechnic is a tertiary education institution in Zaria Kaduna State, Nigeria. The polytechnic was established on 2 February 1989 by the Kaduna state government to provide training and development techniques in the Field of engineering, applied science, commerce and other spheres of learning. The polytechnic is one of the tertiary teaching institutions owned and managed by the Kaduna State government. The polytechnic was named after the then Nigeria's foreign minister Nuhu Bamalli. In August 2022, Barrister Abdullahi Zubair Abdullahi was appointed the new Registrar of the polytechnic.

== History ==
The school was established in February 1989, during the administration of Colonel Dangiwa Umar. The polytechnic was established to provide training and development of techniques in Applied Sciences, Engineering and Commerce, as well as other spheres of learning. The current Governing Council of the polytechnic as constituted by Governor Nasir El-Rufai in December, 2021. Chairman of the council is Ishaya Dare Akawu, with Haruna Uwais, Gladys Goje and Salisu Garba Kubau. Other members include the Rector, the permanent secretaries of the minist Iries of Health and Finance, a member of the Academic Board, and representatives of the Nigerian Association of Engineers, Ahmadu Bello University and Ministry of Justice.

== List of Courses Offered by Nuhu Bamalli Polytechnic ==
Nuhu Bamalli Polytechnic, Zaria, Kaduna State has been authoritatively certify as well as perceived by the National Board for technical education (NBTE), Nigeria.

The following are the rundown of courses on offer at the Nuhu Bamalli Polytechnic, Zaria, Kaduna State.

1. ACCOUNTANCY
2. AGRICULTURAL ENGINEERING/TECHNOLOGY
3. AGRICULTURAL TECHNOLOGY
4. ARCHITECTURAL TECHNOLOGY
5. BANKING AND FINANCE
6. BUILDING TECHNOLOGY
7. BUSINESS ADMINISTRATION & MANAGEMENT
8. CIVIL ENGINEERING TECHNOLOGY
9. COMPUTER ENGINEERING
10. COMPUTER SCIENCE
11. ELECTRICAL/ELECTRONIC ENGINEERING TECHNOLOGY
12. ESTATE MANAGEMENT AND VALUATION
13. MASS COMMUNICATION
14. MECHANICAL ENGINEERING TECHNOLOGY
15. OFFICE TECHNOLOGY AND MANAGEMENT
16. PUBLIC ADMINISTRATION
17. QUANTITY SURVEYING
18. SCIENCE LABORATORY TECHNOLOGY
19. STATISTICS
20. URBAN AND REGIONAL PLANNING

=== Upgrade Your ND/HND Diploma at Nuhu Bamalli Polytechnic, Zaria ===
Nuhu bamalli polytechnic offers an overhaul program for ND HND graduates hoping to help their grades, the one year program is available to ND pass grade from NUBAPOLY and HND pass/lower grade from any perceive polytechnic.

In a move intended to give open doors to ND and HND graduates with lower grades, Nuhu Bamalli Polytechnic (NUBAPOLY), Zaria, has sent off an Overhaul Program. This drive empowers graduates to further develop their Recognition grouping without the need to begin from the 100 level.

Nuhu Bamalli Polytechnic (NUBAPOLY), Zaria
Programme	Upgrade Programme for ND/HND Graduates
Aim of the Programme	To improve the grades of ND/HND graduates with pass/lower credit
Admission Requirements	ND/HND certificate, Transcript, Completion/Exemption of NYSC for HND Applicants
Eligible Applicants	ND pass grades from NUBAPOLY, HND pass/lower grades from any recognized Polytechnic
Duration of Programme	One academic session (two semesters)
Lecture/Contact Period	Fridays and Saturdays
Application Procedure	Online via the NUBAPOLY website

== Schools and Campuses ==
The main campus of the polytechnic is located in the old UPE, along Kaduna-Zaria road with additional campuses at Tudun wada Gaskiya, and Samaru Kataf, in Zangon Kataf local Government Area of Kaduna State. The schools are:

=== Main Campus ===
- School of Applied Sciences
- School of Engineering
- School of Environmental
- School of Liberal Studies
- School of Vocational and Technical Education

=== Tudun Wada Campus ===
- School of Management Studies
- School of Advance and Preliminary Studies.

=== Samarun Kataf Campus ===
- School of Agricultural Technology

== Bandit attack ==
On 15 November 2020, bandits attacked the main campus of the polytechnic. The staff and students kidnapped by the bandits were released in July 2021, after a ransom had been paid.
