= Zonkwa =

Zonkwa Azunkwa
- Town
- Nickname: Zonk City
- Location within Nigeria
- Coordinates: 09°47′N 08°17′E
- Country: Nigeria
- State: Kaduna State
- LGA: Zangon Kataf
- Chiefdom: Bajju

Government
  - Type: Elective Monarchy
  - Agwam Bajju: Agwam Nuhu Bature Achi
- Elevation: 798 m (2,618 ft)
- Time zone: UTC+01:00 (WAT)
- Climate: Aw

Zonkwa (Jju: A̱zunkwa) is the Zangon Kataf Local Government Area as well as the Bajju Chiefdom headquarters, in southern Kaduna state in the Middle Belt region of Nigeria. And the name of the chairman is Bege Gaiya Joseph.

== Geography ==
=== Landscape ===
Zonkwa possesses an elevation of 798m.

=== Climate ===
Zonkwa has an average annual temperature of about 24.8 °C (76.6 °F), average yearly highs of about 28.6 °C (83.5 °F) and lows of 18.8 °C (65.8 °F), with zero rainfalls at the ends and beginnings of the year with a yearly average precipitation of about 28.1 mm (1.11 in), and an average humidity of 53.7%, similar to that of neighbouring towns Kagoro, Manchok, and Kafanchan.

Climate data for Zonkwa (798m altitude)
Month	Jan	Feb	Mar	Apr	May	Jun	Jul	Aug	Sep	Oct	Nov	Dec	Year
Record high °C (°F)	31 (88)	33 (91)	34 (93)	34 (93)	31 (88)	29 (84)	26 (79)	25 (77)	27 (81)	29 (84)	30 (86)	29 (84)	29.8 (85.6)
Mean daily maximum °C (°F)	29 (84)	32 (90)	34 (93)	33 (91)	30 (86)	27 (81)	24 (75)	22 (72)	24 (75)	28 (82)	29 (84)	31 (88)	28.6 (83.5)
Daily mean °C (°F)	24 (75)	26 (79)	29 (84)	29 (84)	26 (79)	24 (75)	21 (70)	20 (68)	22 (72)	25 (77)	25 (77)	26 (79)	24.8 (76.6)
Mean daily minimum °C (°F)	15 (59)	17 (63)	21 (70)	22 (72)	20 (68)	19 (66)	18 (64)	17 (63)	18 (64)	20 (68)	19 (66)	19 (66)	18.8 (65.8)
Record low °C (°F)	14 (57)	16 (61)	20 (68)	21 (70)	21 (70)	20 (68)	19 (66)	18 (64)	19 (66)	19 (66)	18 (64)	15 (59)	18.3 (64.9)
Average precipitation mm (inches)	0 (0)	1 (0.0)	3.1 (0.12)	13.5 (0.53)	35.5 (1.40)	54.2 (2.13)	71.2 (2.80)	69 (2.7)	60.3 (2.37)	29.3 (1.15)	0.1 (0.00)	0 (0)	28.1 (1.11)
Average precipitation days	0	1	4	12	23	28	31	30	29	18	0	0	14.7
Average relative humidity (%)	24	18	28	48	66	80	88	90	86	61	32	23	53.7
Source: World Weather Online

== Demographics ==
=== People ===
==== Indigenous ====
The indigenous and predominant group in the town are the Bajju people. This town also serves as their headquarters.

==== Other ====
Other groups found in significant populations include the Atyap, Igbo, Bakulu, Hausa, Yoruba, Anghan, and other Nigerian peoples.

=== Politics ===
==== Administrative units ====
Zonkwa is a second-order administrative division with the following 10 towns/villages:

- Zonkwa
- Agut Ntswuo (H.: Samaru Kataf)
- Madauci
- Masat
- Fadiya Yazanom
- Fadiya Mungu
- Fadiya Bosan
- Fadiya Bakut
- Fadan Kaje
- Ungwan Gaya

== Notable people ==
- Katung Aduwak, cinematographer
- Nuhu Bature, paramount ruler

== See also ==
- List of villages in Kaduna State
