= Ayet Atyap annual cultural festival =

Nigerian annual cultural festivals

Ayet Atyap Festival Song A̠yet
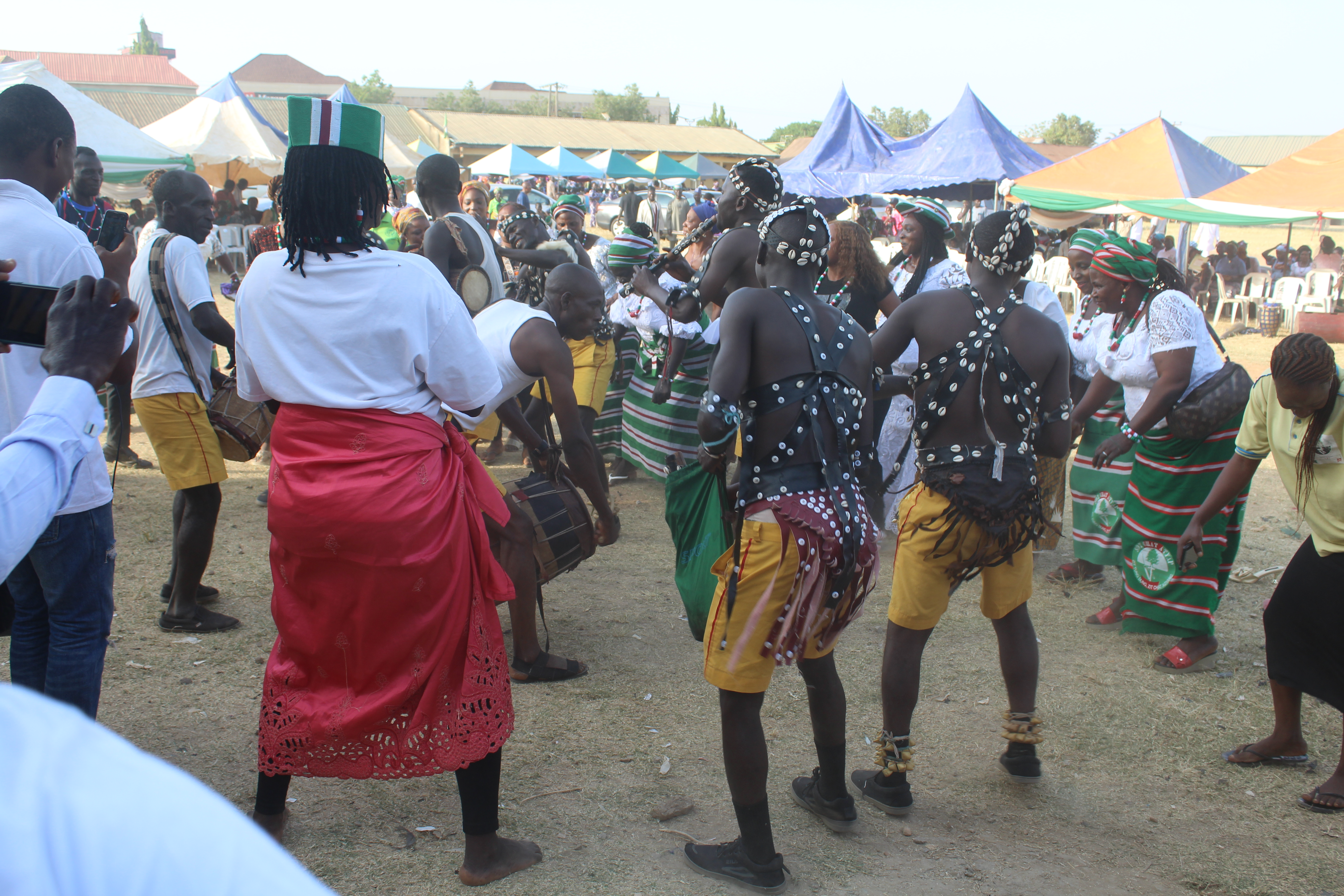
- Display during Ayet Atyap Cultural Festival 15
- Status: Active
- Genre: Festivals
- Frequency: Annually
- Venue: Agwatyap's Palace Square
- Locations: Atak Njei, Zangon Kataf, Kaduna State
- Coordinates: 9°48′N 8°24′E
- Country: Nigeria
- Years active: c. Unknown - Present
- Founder: A̠ku clan
- Previous event: December 31, 2023
- Next event: December 31, 2024
- Major events: • Cultural displays (dances, songs) • Display of cultural artefacts • March pasts • Hunting charade • Bible recitation in Tyap
- Patron: Agwatyap
- Organiser: Atyap Community Development Association (ACDA)
- People: Atyap people

Ayet Atyap Annual Cultural Festival (Tyap: Song A̠yet or Swong A̠yet) is an age-long chain of festive activities and ceremonies observed by the Atyap people of Southern Kaduna, Middle Belt Nigeria. It was traditionally carried out to usher in the farming season for the year between mid-March and mid-April and was organized by male members, the Aku clan who have already been initiated into the Abwoi cult. Of recent, the event has been shifted to December and celebrated in the Agwatyap's palace square in Atak Njei, Zangon Kataf LGA, southern Kaduna State. It is usually well attended by important guests from within and outside the state, including political and traditional leaders.

== Gallery ==
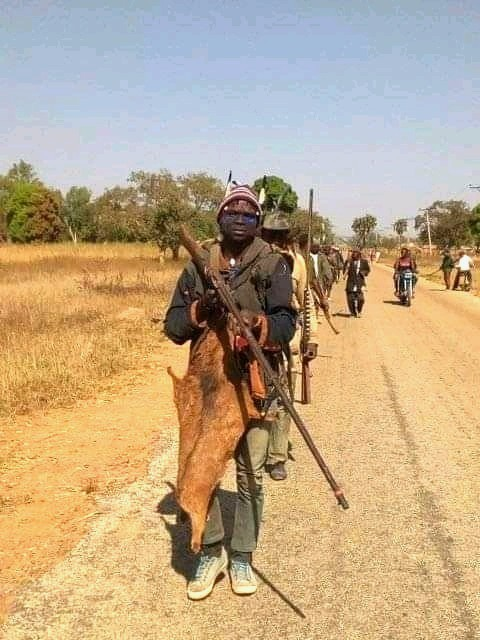
Atyap hunters marching in the morning to the Agwatyap's palace during the Ayet Atyap Festival 2019 Edition.

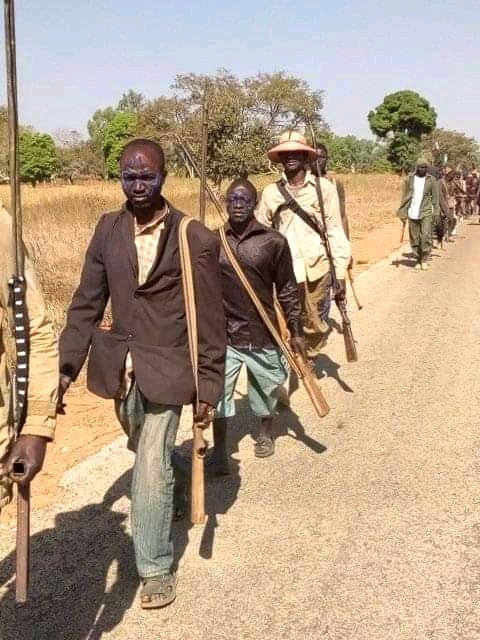
Atyap hunters en-route the Agwatyap's palace.

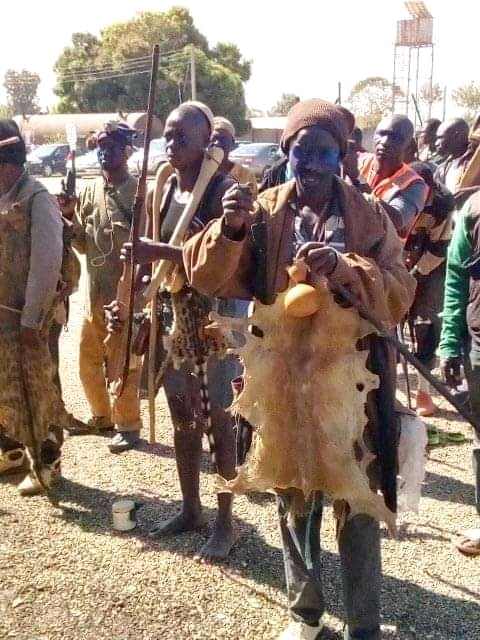
Atyap hunters in the Agwatyap's palace.

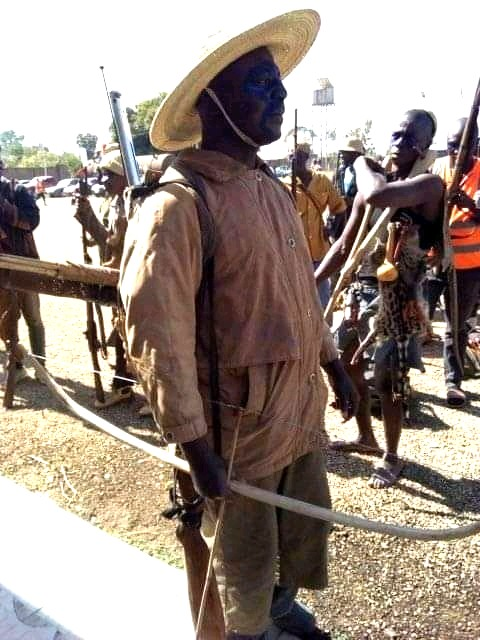
Agwak Akat (Chief hunter).

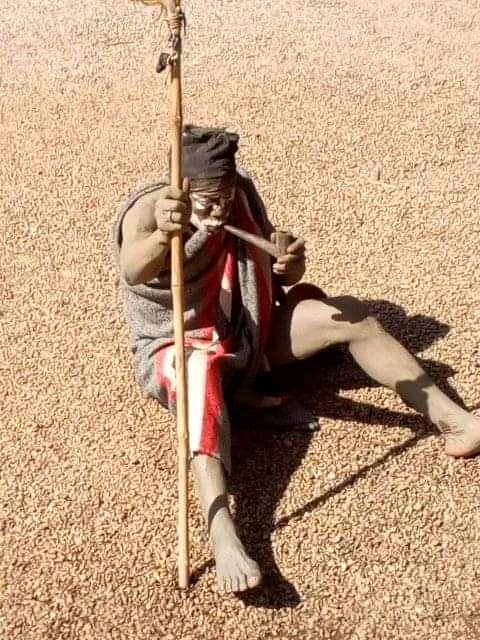
Alan Awum, Traditional medicine man.

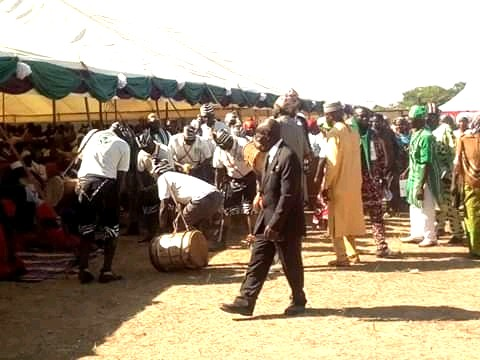
Drummers performing before the Agwatyap and other guests.

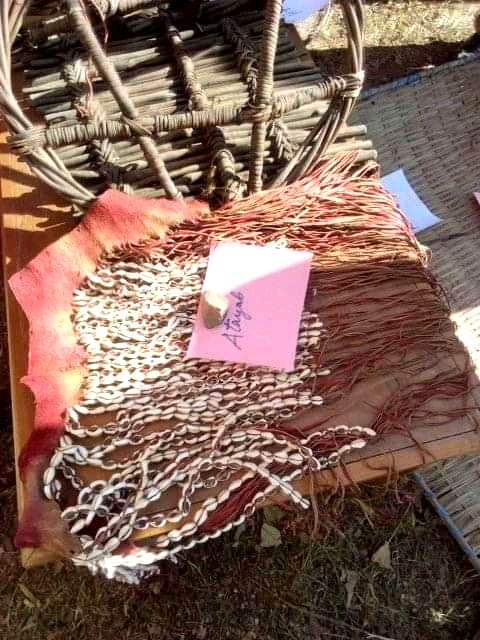
Cultural artefacts display: Atayep.

== See also ==
- Afan festival
- Festivals in Nigeria
