= Atsam people =

Ethnic group in Middle Belt, Nigeria

Atsam
Total population
- 107,000

Regions with significant populations
- Nigeria

Languages
- Atsam

Religion
- Christianity, Islam, Ethnic religion

Related ethnic groups
- Akurmi, Afizere, Irigwe, Bajju, Atyap, and other Benue-Congo peoples of Middle Belt and southern Nigeria

The Atsam people (Tyap: A̱tsamyia̱; Hausa: Cawai, Chawai) are found mainly in Kauru Local Government Area of Kaduna State, Middle Belt (central) Nigeria. They speak the Atsam language, an East Kainji language. Their headquarters are in the town of Damakasuwa, a few kilometres from Chawai, west of the city of Jos.

== Demographics ==
=== Distribution ===
Atsam people are native to the Tsam (Chawai) Chiefdom, Kauru LGA of southern Kaduna State, and adjoining areas of Bassa, Plateau State, Nigeria. The Chiefdom is located in the southeastern part of Kauru LGA. As of the 2006 Nigerian population census, it was said to have over 80,000 people. It has a land area of 1,125 square kilometres and is bound by the Moroa and Ganawuri Chiefdoms to the south; the Irigwe and Rukuba Chiefdoms (in Bassa LGA of Plateau State) to the east, demarcated by a hilly border; Lere, Piriga and Kumana Chiefdoms to the north; and Atyap Chiefdom to the west.

=== Religion ===
The Atsam people practice Christianity, Islam, and the ethnic religion which appears to be dying out due to the dominance of the first two.

== Language ==
The Atsam people speak an East-Kainji language bearing the same name, Atsam. Like other languages around the region, it is an endangered language due to the increased speaking of the Hausa language.

== Politics ==
=== History ===
The Atsam people were said to have had a central administrative system or a kingdom before circa 1350 A.D. Between 1902 and 1905, the British fought to subjugate the Atsam. In 1907, they were brought under the British control. The colonial government placed the Atsam under one of the vassal states they created under the Zazzau Emirate, the Chawai district. The Atsam were semi-independent and self-appointed their local chief and called him the Sarkin Chawai or Sarkin Kauru. The district was said to be later merged with the Zangon Kataf district and regained its independence in 1975.

Today, the Atsam people are organized in a political unit called the Tsam (or Chawai) Chiefdom. It was created in 2001 by the Kaduna State government under Ahmed Makarfi. Its ruler is called the Res-Tsam. The headquarters of the chiefdom are in Damakasuwa.

=== Ruling houses ===
The Tsam Chiefdom initially had two ruling houses: Kingwai and Kiragito/Kuka. The Zambina clan served as the chairman of the kingmakers, while the Maizanko and the Madaki serve as members. It is noteworthy that the Zambina clan was claimed to be the oldest and only ruling house before the British colonial regime. The 15th Res-Tsam, Res Danlami Yahaya (reigned 1975 - April 6, 2014) was from the Kingwai clan/ruling house.

In all, the line of rulers of the Atsam people include:

1. Res Mohammed Jatau (Kingwari/Kargi clan)
2. Res Mohammed Babari (Kingwari/Kargi clan)
3. Res Yunusa Maikahon Gada (Karigato/Kuka clan)
4. Res Bako Yunusa (Kiragato/Kuka clan)
5. Res Ningardi Babari (Kingwari/Kargi clan)
6. Res Isa Babari (Kingwari/Kargi clan)
7. Res Ahmadu Umaru (Kingwari/Kargi clan)
8. Res Gwaza Isa (Kingwari/Kargi clan)
9. Res Abdulmumini Ahmadu (Kingwari/Kargi clan)
10. Res Mohammed Gani Bako (Kiragato/Kuka clan)
11. Res Mohammed Sani Ahmadu (Kingwari/Kargi)
12. Res Umaru Bako (Kiragato/Kuka)
13. Res Abdujikan Bako (Kiragato/Kuka clan)
14. Res Abubakar Damai Ahmadu (Kingwari/Kargi clan).
15. Res Danlami Yahaya (district head, 1975 - 2001; Res-Tsam 19 January 2001 – 6 April 2014, as a 3rd class chief from Kingwai clan).
16. Res Yahaya Mohammad (2014-date)

=== Districts and villages ===
The chiefdom consists of six districts, including:

1. Damakasuwa district. Its centre is at Damakasuwa. Its villages include: Kichiguya, Rafingora, Mangul, Kisari.
2. Zambina district. Its centre is at Kingwan Makama Chawai. Its villages include: Badurum, Kurmi-Risga, Ungwan Rana.
3. Fadan Chawai district. Its centre is at Fadan Chawai. Its villages include: Kibobi, Talo, Riban.
4. Pari district. Its centre is at Kiffin Chawai. Its villages include: Kiffin Chawai, Pari.
5. Kamaru district. Its centre is at Kizakoro. Its villages include: Kamaru, Kihoba, Kizakoro, Kizachi, Kuyan Bana.
6. Bakin Kogi district.

The districts are overseen by the District Heads, and the villages in the districts are led by Village Heads.
