= Kamantan =

Kamantan may be,

- Kamantan people
- Kamantan language
