= Zagom =

Zagom Zagom Kajere, Zagom Gida
- Village
- Location within Nigeria
- Coordinates: 09°51′N 08°26′E
- Country: Nigeria
- State: Kaduna State
- LGA: Zangon Kataf
- District: Fadiya
- Time zone: UTC+01:00 (WAT)
- 6-digits numeric: 802150
- Climate: Aw

Zagom (also Zakum, Zagom Kajere, Zagom Gida) is a locality in Ikulu, Fadiya District of Zangon Kataf Local Government Area, southern Kaduna state in the Middle Belt region of Nigeria. The postal code for the village is 802150.

Zagom is situated nearby to the village Kamantan, as well as near Kamaru Hausawa.
