= Jummai =

- Gender: Female
- Language: Chadic languages and Fulfulde

Origin
- Language: Arabic
- Meaning: Friday
- Region of origin: Northern Nigeria

Jummai is a feminine given name of Nigerian origin, derived from the Arabic word for 'Friday', jumuʿa. It is consequently given to Friday-born girls and common among the Fulbe, Hausa people, and Kanuri people. Among the Hausa, its masculine form is Danjuma (lit. 'Son of Friday').

== People with this first name ==
- Jummai Bitrus (born 1996), Nigerian volleyball player

== People with this middle name ==
- Aisha Jummai Al-Hassan (1959–2021), Nigerian lawyer and politician
- Eugenia Jummai Amodu (born 1962), Nigerian journalist, writer, and poet
- Ruth Jummai Ango (born 1971), Nigerian politician
