= Ishaya Bakut =

Nigerian politician and general

Major General Ishaya Bakut

Commander, ECOMOG Peacekeeping Force, Liberia
- In office September 1991 – December 1992
- Preceded by: Maj-Gen. R.M. Kupolati
- Succeeded by: Brig-Gen. T. Olurin

Military Governor of Benue State
- In office 18 Sep 1986 – December 1987
- Preceded by: Yohanna Madaki
- Succeeded by: Idris Garba

Personal details
- Born: 16 August 1947 Kurmi-Bi, Zonkwa, Zangon Kataf LGA, Kaduna State, Nigeria
- Died: 21 March 2015 (aged 67)

Military service
- Allegiance: Nigeria
- Branch/service: Nigerian Army
- Rank: Major General

Ishaya Bakut (16 August 1947 – 21 March 2015) was Military Governor of Benue State in Nigeria from September 1986 to December 1987 during the military regime of General Ibrahim Babangida. He was Field Commander in Liberia of the ECOMOG West African multinational force from September 1991 to December 1992.

== Birth and education ==
Ishaya Bakut was born on 16 August 1947 in Kurmi-Bi, Zonkwa in Zangon Kataf LGA in Kaduna State. He attended Government College, Kaduna (1961–1965) on a Shell BP Scholarship. In 1966 he went to the Nigerian Defence Academy, Kaduna, graduating in March 1969, when he was commissioned as 2nd Lieutenant. He attended Ahmadu Bello University, Zaria (1971–1975) where he earned a BSc Engineering. He attended the United States School of Engineering (1977–1978), the Command and Staff College, Jaji (1979–1980) and the National Defence College, New Delhi in 1985 where he obtained his MSc

== Early military career ==
He was a Company and Battalion Commander in the Infantry during the Nigerian Civil War (1969–1970). He was appointed Commander of 41 Engineers Brigade, Kaduna in 1976 and became a Senior Operations Officer, Operational Engineering. He served in the Nigerian contingent of the UNIFIL peacekeeping mission in Lebanon (April 1980 – February 1981). Other positions were Directing Command and Staff College, Jaji (1981–1983), Colonel, General Staff and Army Headquarters, Lagos, and Commander 41 Engineers Brigade, Kaduna.

== Later career ==
Col. Bakut was appointed Military Governor of Benue state on 18 September 1986. There were no major developments in the state during his rule, which ended in December 1987.

He was appointed Field Commander in Liberia of the ECOMOG West African multinational force on 28 September 1991. He declared his intention that ECOMOG would be an impartial and non-political peacekeeping force. Shortly after, troops from Senegal arrived to strengthen ECOMOG, and were later deployed to Bong County in preparation for a planned disarmament of the rebel forces. However, Charles Taylor ordered his troops to attack the Senegalese, whom Bakut persuaded with difficulty to remain on the defensive. Soon after the Senegalese withdrew from the mission. His replacement by Brigadier Adetunji Olurin had just been announced in October 1992, when Charles Taylor launched a terror attack on Monrovia. His troops barely maintained control of parts of the city until Olurin arrived in December 1992.

In 1995 he was Principal Officer to Chief of General Staff, Lt. General Oladipo Diya. On 21 March 2015, he died at the age of 67.
