= Damakasuwa =

- Town
- Location within Nigeria
- Coordinates: 09°58′N 08°32′E
- Country: Nigeria
- State: Kaduna State
- Time zone: UTC+01:00 (WAT)
- Climate: Aw

Damakasuwa is a town and headquarters of the Tsam Chiefdom of the Atsam people in Kauru Local Government Area in southern Kaduna state in the Middle Belt region of Nigeria. The postal code of the area is 811.

== Geography ==
Damakasuwa is a village in Southern Kaduna state and has an elevation of 809 meters above sea level and its population amount to 171,672. Damakasuwa is situated nearby to Unguwar Rana and Unguwar Doka.

The following are some major GPS points near Damakasuwa include:

Unguwar Rana

Unguwar Doka

Talo

Riban

Fadan Chawai

Mariri

Piti

Chawai

Baduru

Bari Forest Reserve

Kurmin Rizga

Zaria Native Area Number 10

Kitbin

Wafi Forest Reserve

Bakin Kogi

Damakasua Forest Reserve

Zaria Native Area Number 11

== See also ==
- List of villages in Kaduna State
