= Atak Nfang =

Atak Nfang (Zaman Dabo) Atak Nfang Atakfang
- District and Village
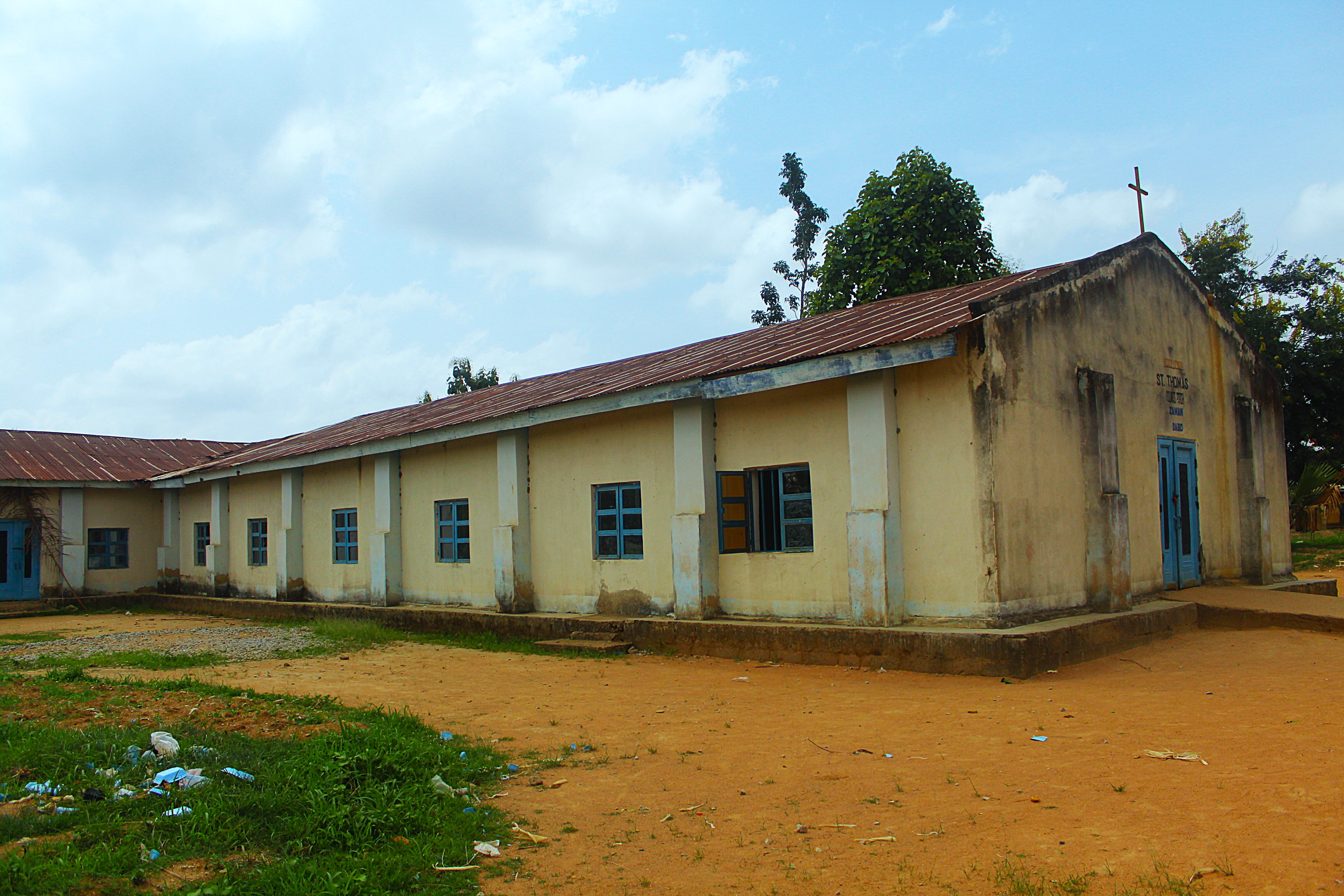
- St. Thomas Aquinas Parish

- Location within Nigeria
- Coordinates: 09°51′N 08°28′E
- Country: Nigeria
- State: Kaduna State
- LGA: Zangon Kataf
- Time zone: UTC+01:00 (WAT)
- Climate: Aw

Atak Nfang (Hausa: Zaman Dabo) is a district and a village community in Zangon Kataf Local Government Area, southern Kaduna state in the Middle Belt region of Nigeria. The postal code for the area is 802142.

== Settlements ==
The following are some major settlements in Atak Nfang (Zaman Dabo) district include:

- Atak Agbaat
- Atakmawai (H. Kurmin Masara)
- Atak Nfang (Zaman Dabo)
- Apyia Akoo (Kankurmi)
- Chawai Zaman Dabo
- Chen Akoo (Zama Awon)
- Doka
- Kan Kibori
- Kibori
- Kitibir
- Makomurum
- Manyi Mashin
- Manyi Sansak
- Marana (Ungwan Rana)
- Sabon Gini
- Ungwan Maichibi

== Demographics ==
The people of Atak Nfang (Zaman Dabo) district are majorly Atyap people. Although settlers from other parts of the country are found in parts of the district.

== Note ==
- Achi, B.; Bitiyonɡ, Y. A.; Bunɡwon, A. D.; Baba, M. Y.; Jim, L. K. N.; Kazah-Toure, M.; Philips, J. E. A Short History of the Atyap (2019). Zaria: Tamaza Publishinɡ Co. Ltd. ISBN 978-978-54678-5-7. Pp. 9–245.

== See also ==
- Atyap chiefdom
- Jei
- Kanai
- List of villages in Kaduna State
- Zango Urban
- Zonzon
