= Nuhu Bature =

Agwam Kajju I

A̠gwam Nuhu Bature Achi (OON)
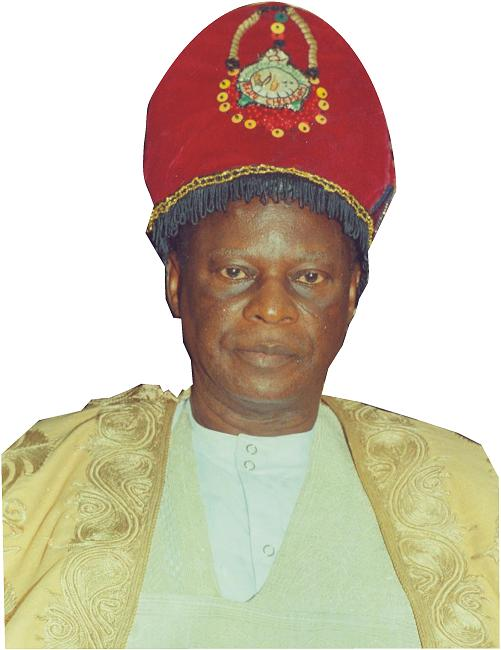

Paramount ruler of Kajju Chiefdom
- In office: 1995 – 18 December 2021 on Saturday
- Coronation: 1995
- Successor: Agwam Luka Kogi Yabwat
- Born: 14th July
- Died: 18 December 2021; Kafanchan, Kaduna in Nigeria
- Burial: Agwam Bajju's palace, Zonkwa
- Spouse: Fidelia
Names
- English: Nuhu Bature Achi; Jju: Nuhu Ba̱ture A̱cci
- Religion: Christianity

Styles of Agwam Bajju I
- Reference style: His Royal Highness
- Spoken style: Your Royal Highness
- Alternative style: Jju: A̱gwam (King)

Nuhu Bature Achi (19?? – December 18, 2021) was the first paramount ruler of Kajju (also Bajju) Chiefdom, a Nigerian traditional state in southern Kaduna State, Nigeria. He was also known by the title, "A̠gwam Ba̠jju 1".

Bature became the first monarch of the Bajju Chiefdom after its creation in 1995, following the Zangon Kataf crises of 1992 in which a resolution was reached and the creation of the long-agitated independent Chiefdom for the Atyap and Bajju from the British-imposed Zazzau Emirate was arrived at. In 2012, HRH Agwam Bature decreed that 17 years after the creation of the chiefdom, Ka̠jju (the land of the Bajju people) was yet to have a palace.

Nuhu Bature ?Dibyyi royal house Born: ?? Died: December 18, 2021
Regnal titles
Preceded by Title established	Agwam [B-/K-]ajju I 1996–18 December 2021	Succeeded by Luka Kogi Yabwat
