= Ruth Jummai Ango =

Nigerian politician

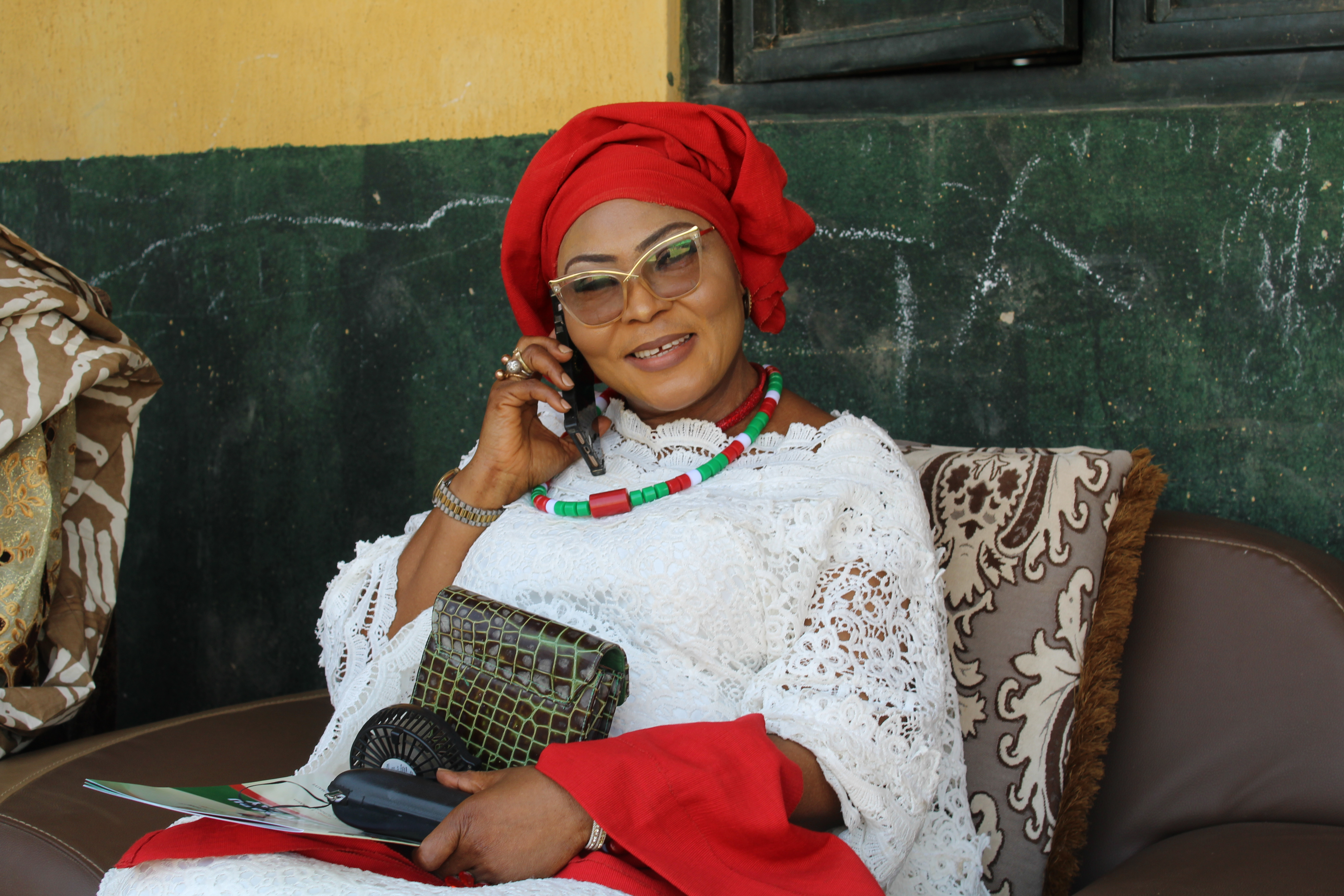
- Ango in November 2024

Member of the House of Representatives
- In office 2003–2007
- Constituency: Zangon Kataf/Jaba Federal Constituency

Personal details
- Born: December 1971 (age 54) Kaduna State, Nigeria
- Party: All Nigeria Peoples Party (ANPP)
- Occupation: Politician

Ruth Jummai Ango is a Nigerian politician born in December 1971 in Kaduna State. She represented the Zangon Kataf/Jaba Federal Constituency in the 5th National Assembly from 2003 to 2007 under the All Nigeria Peoples Party (ANPP). She trained as a nurse and midwife at St. Gerard's Catholic Hospital in Kaduna and attended the College of Nursing in Kafanchan.
