= Luka Kogi Yabwat =

Agwam Kajju II

Agwam Luka Kogi Yabwat
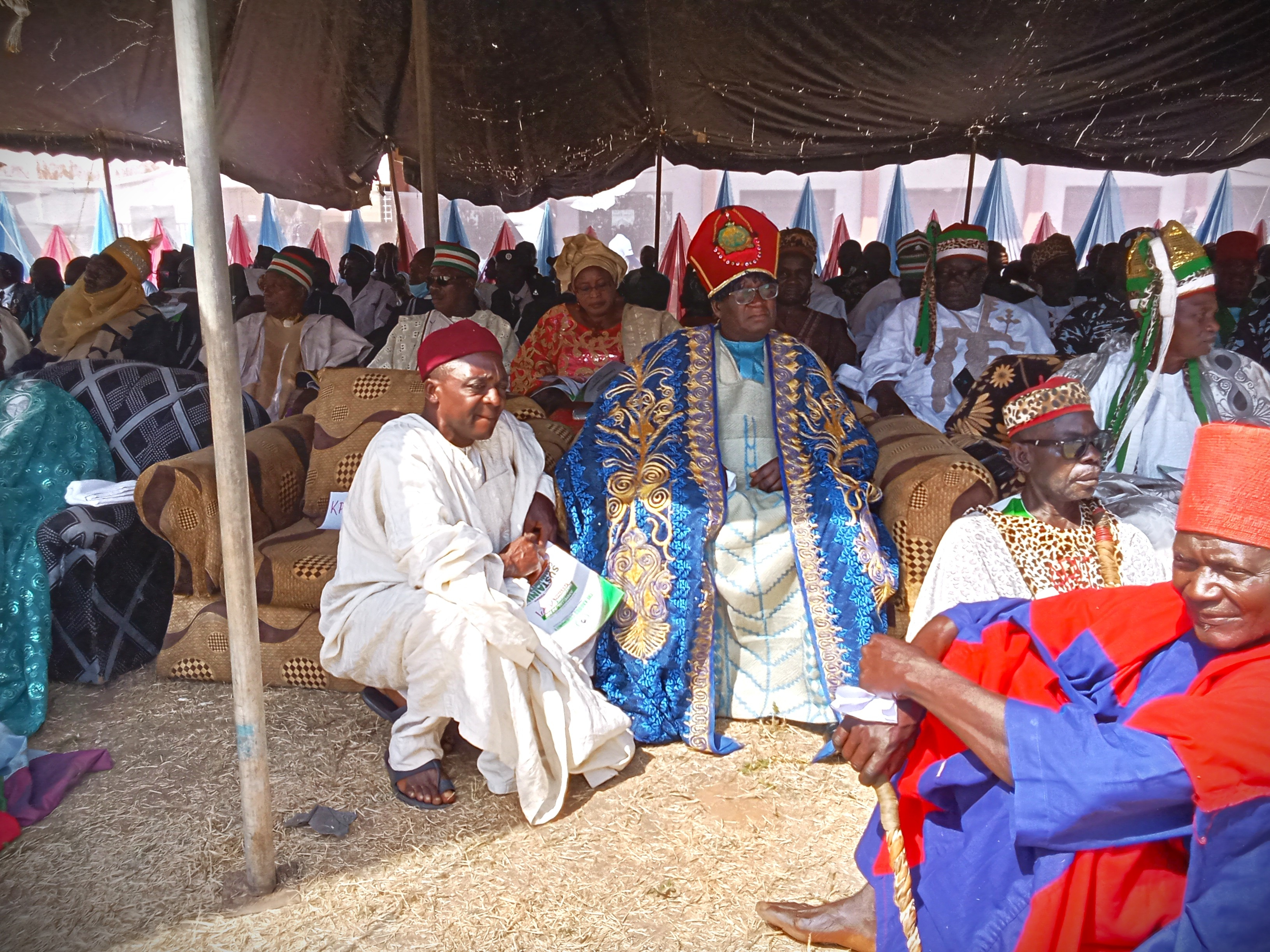
- During Afan festival in January 2024.

Paramount ruler of Kajju Chiefdom
- In office: 24 December 2022 – date
- Capping: 24 December 2022
- Predecessor: Agwam Nuhu Bature Achi
- Born: 15 May 1954 (age 72)
Names
- English: Luka Kogi Yabuwat; Jju: Luka Kogi Yabvwat
- House: Banyenhwan
- Father: Kogi Yabwat
- Religion: Protestantism

Styles of Agwam Kajju II
- Reference style: His Royal Highness
- Spoken style: Your Royal Highness
- Alternative style: Jju: A̱gwam (King)

Luka Kogi Yabwat, also Luka Kogi Yabuwat (born May 15, 1954, in Marsa, Zangon Kataf) is the second paramount ruler of Kajju Chiefdom, a Nigerian traditional state in southern Kaduna State, Nigeria. He is also known by the title, A̠gwam Ka̠jju II. He was appointed by the Kaduna State governor, Nasir el-Rufai, in December 2022 as the second paramount ruler of the Bajju people. He ascended the throne, a year after the demise of his predecessor, Agwam Nuhu Bature Achi in December 2021. Before his ascendancy, he was the district head of Bvokpat (H. Ungwar Rimi). In the appointments made by the governor as of that period, Yabwat was the third district head to get appointed as a traditional ruler.

== Education and career ==
Yabwat holds a master's degree in Public Administration from the Ahmadu Bello University, Zaria. He retired as a deputy superintendent of the Nigerian Correctional Service.

== Coronation ==
=== Concerns from SOKAPU ===
In an interview granted by Daily Trust in January 2023, the SOKAPU spokesman, Luka Binniyat, viewed the lowering of the status of the chiefs from the Southern Kaduna area from first-class status to a lower rank as an attempt to downgrade the traditional institutions. Yabwat joined 12 other chiefs from the Southern Kaduna area either demoted or had been so when he got handed over the staff of office in December 2022.

Luka Kogi Yabwat Banyenhwan royal house Born: May 15, 1954
Regnal titles
Preceded by Nuhu Bature	Agwam Kajju II; 2022–present	Incumbent; Heir: Yet-to-be-named
