= Atakmawai =

Atakmawai A̱takmawai Kankurmin, Kurmin Masara
- Village
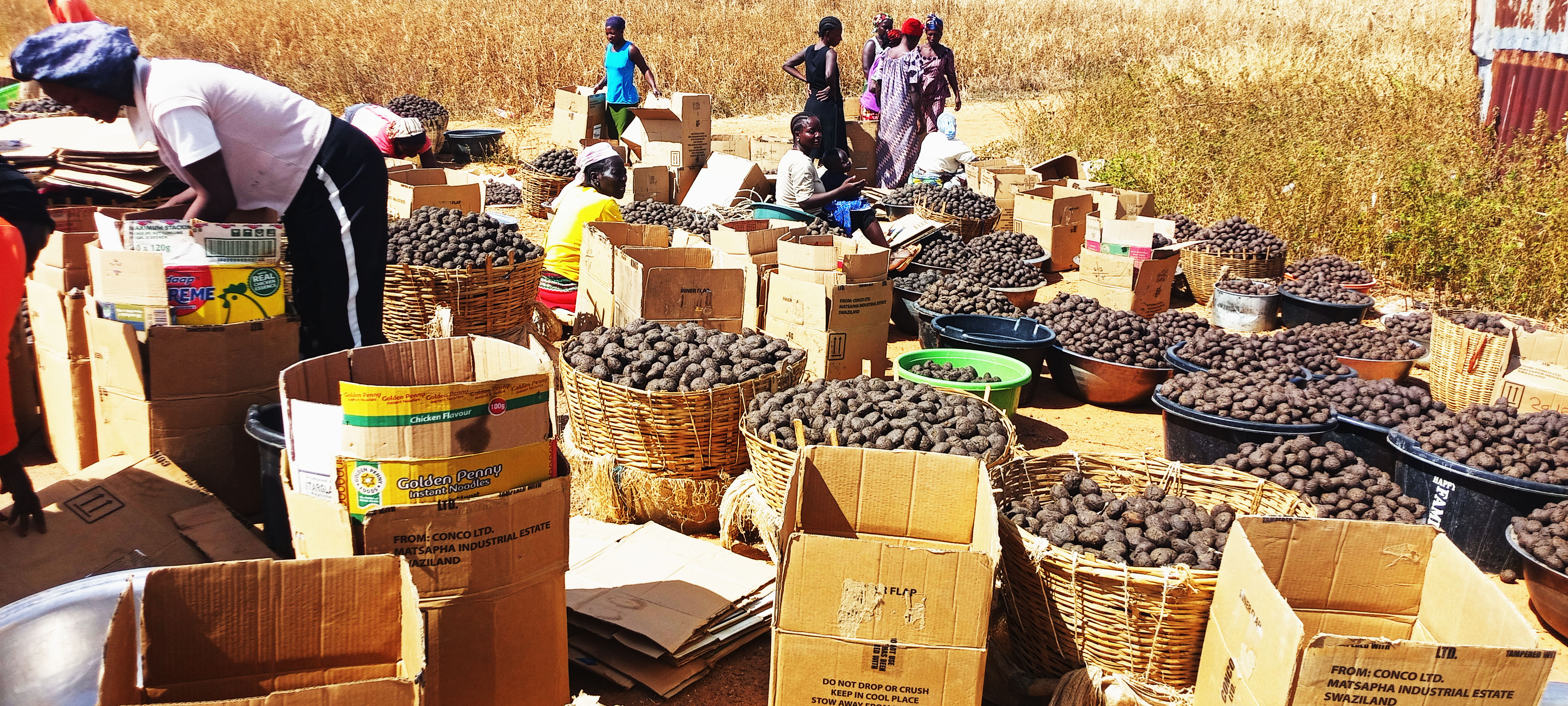
- Atakmawai women selling locust beans cake

- Location within Nigeria
- Coordinates: 09°51′N 08°27′E
- Country: Nigeria
- State: Kaduna State
- LGA: Zangon Kataf
- Time zone: UTC+01:00 (WAT)
- Climate: Aw

Atakmawai (also spelled Atak Mawai, Tyap: A̱takmawa̱i, Hausa: Kankurmin, Kurmin Masara), is a village community located in Zonzon district of Zangon Kataf Local Government Area, southern Kaduna state in the Middle Belt region of Nigeria. The postal code for the area is 802144. The community has been the target for several deadly attacks by gunmen over the years 2021 and 2022.

== Insecurity ==
This village suffered from deadly attacks between 2020 and 2022. In August 2020, as part of wider attacks across the region, Atakmawai was one of several Atyap communities targeted by gunmen. The attacks resulted in dozens of deaths and the burning of many houses. Also, in January 2022, Atakmawai was attacked by gunmen who killed over 10 people and burned numerous homes. The assault occurred while residents were sleeping. In response to a distress call, Nigerian Air Force Special Forces were ambushed while mobilizing to the scene. However, the strategies were not limited to the rural areas but also included numerous villages and several communities within the local government area.

== Climate Condition ==
The area has two season which is the raining and dry season of the year.

== See also ==
- List of villages in Kaduna State
