= Heaven's Hell =

Film

- Theatrical release poster
- Directed by: Katung Aduwak
- Written by: Tenyin Ikpe Etim; Uyai Ikpe Etim
- Produced by: Katung Aduwak; Tenyin Ikpe Etim
- Starring: Nse Ikpe Etim; Fabian Adeoye Lojede; Bimbo Akintola; Chet Anekwe; Damilola Adegbite; OC Ukeje; Kalu Ikeagwu; Femi Jacobs; Bimbo Manuel; Gideon Okeke
- Cinematography: Jeffrey Smith; Matthew Sleboda
- Edited by: Sammie Amachree
- Music by: Tola Adeogun; Triumph 'Tyrone' Grandeur
- Production companies: One O Eight Media; BGL Asset Management Ltd; Hashtag Media House
- Distributed by: Genesis Distribution
- Release date: 10 May 2019
- Running time: 95 minutes
- Country: Nigeria
- Language: English

Heaven's Hell is a 2019 Nigerian psychological drama film, produced and directed by Katung Aduwak; it stars an ensemble cast which includes Nse Ikpe Etim, Fabian Adeoye Lojede, Bimbo Akintola, Chet Anekwe, Damilola Adegbite, OC Ukeje, Kalu Ikeagwu, Femi Jacobs, Bimbo Manuel and Gideon Okeke. It was majorly financed by BGL Asset Management Ltd and One O Eight Media, with production support of other partners such as Hashtag Media House and Aberystwyth University.

The film was initially scheduled for release on 23 January 2015, but was delayed due to censorship. It was eventually released on 10 May 2019.

== Synopsis ==
The film, which was inspired by a true story, is set in Lagos city and tells the story of two housewives whose bond of friendship seem unbreakable, but is filled with deceit and betrayal; in the midst of the darkness that hovers above their relationships with their spouses.

== Cast ==
- Fabian Adeoye Lojede as Edward Henshaw
- Nse Ikpe Etim as Alice Henshaw
- Chet Anekwe as Jeff Aliu
- Bimbo Akintola as Tsola Aliu
- Damilola Adegbite as Janet Cole
- OC Ukeje as Ahmed
- Kalu Ikeagwu as Efosa Elliots
- Gideon Okeke as Akanimo
- Femi Jacobs as Detective Popoola
- Bimbo Manuel as Chief Justice
- Katherine Obiang as Tara
- Linda Ejiofor as Secretary
- Waje Iruobe as Estate Agent

== Production ==
Heaven’s Hell has been flagged as a film that intends to help fight domestic violence against women and children. Aduwak states: "...as it seems, domestic violence is still handled with kid's gloves in this part of the world. Ultimately, I want Heaven’s Hell to liberate people. I want it to inspire someone to get out of a bad relationship [..] whatever it can accomplish to make the world a saner place". The development of the film took a year, after which principal photography commenced on 9 April 2013 in Lagos with the major cast. A couple of scenes were shot in Kirikiri Maximum and Medium Security Prisons in Lagos. Filming in Lagos lasted over three weeks, after which shooting was moved to Wales, where some scenes were also filmed. The film was shot using Sony F55 cameras, and the film's production was led by Jeffrey Smith. The project was majorly financed by BGL Asset Management Ltd & One O Eight Media, with production support of other partners such as Hashtag Media House, and Aberystwyth University.

=== Soundtrack ===
The official soundtrack from the film, titled "3rd World War", was performed by Jesse Jagz and Femi Kuti, and was released on 7 August 2013.

== Promotions and release ==
A press conference for the film was held on 8 April 2013 at Clear Essence, Ikoyi, Lagos, where it was announced that the film would be released in the third quarter of 2013. It was however postponed for unknown reasons.In December 2014, FilmOne Distribution officially announced that the film would be released on 23 January 2015; it has however been delayed by the Nigerian Films and Video Censors Board due to the presence of some "explicit and inciting content". The filmmakers have been advised to re-edit the film before it can be released. The distribution of the film which was initially helmed by FilmOne, has now been taken over by Genesis Distribution. The film was eventually released theatrically on 10 May 2019.
