= Jei District =

Jei (Unguwar Gaiya) Jei Unguwar Gaiya
- District
- Location within Nigeria
- Coordinates: 09°48′N 08°24′E
- Country: Nigeria
- State: Kaduna State
- LGA: Zangon Kataf
- Time zone: UTC+01:00 (WAT)
- Postal code: 802143
- Climate: Aw

Jei (Hausa: Unguwar Gaiya) is district of Zangon Kataf Local Government Area, southern Kaduna state in the Middle Belt region of Nigeria. The postal code for the area is 802130.

== Settlements ==
The following are some major settlements in Jei district include:

- Apyia Gbaza (H. Kangwaza)
- Apyinzwang
- Akputuut
- Ashong Ashyui (H. Jankasa)
- Atak Njei (H. Gidan Gata)
- Atyecarak (Attachirak; H. Kacecere)
- Awak
- Chenkwon (H. Samaru Kataf)
- Langson
- Madoo
- Magata (also Afan Tsaai)
- Magaya (H. Ung. Gaiya)
- Majuju (H. Ung. Juju)
- Makarau
- Makwakhwu (H. Kurmin Dawaki)
- Manchong
- Manyi Aminyam
- Manyi Ashyui
- Manta Ason
- Matagama
- Mavwuong
- Mayayit (H. Ung. Jaba)
- Sop Akoo (H. Mabushi) I, II

== Demographics ==
The district is primarily made up of Atyap people, traditionally the territory of the Jei sub-clan of the Agbaat clan.

== Economy ==
The economic base of the area is agriculture. However, there are other non-agricultural businesses operating especially in the bigger settlements such as Chenkwon (Samaru Kataf).

== Note ==
- Achi, B.; Bitiyonɡ, Y. A.; Bunɡwon, A. D.; Baba, M. Y.; Jim, L. K. N.; Kazah-Toure, M.; Philips, J. E. "A Short History of the Atyap" (2019). Zaria: Tamaza Publishinɡ Co. Ltd. ISBN 978-978-54678-5-7. Pp. 9–245.

== See also ==
- Atak Nfang
- Atyap chiefdom
- Kanai
- List of villages in Kaduna State
- Zango Urban
- Zonzon
