= Yohanna Sidi Kukah =

HRH Agwom Yohanna Sidi Kukah

Monarch of Akulu chiefdom
- In office: 12 November 2010 - present
- Predecessor: Agwom Bitrus Kable Ibrahim
- Born: Anchuna, Northern Region, British Nigeria (now Anchuna, Kaduna State, Nigeria)
Names
- Yohanna Sidi Kukah
- House: Gunkyana
- Religion: Christianity
- Occupation: • Agwom Akulu

Yohanna Sidi Kukah is the incumbent monarch of Akulu chiefdom of the Bakulu people in southern Kaduna State, Middle Belt, Nigeria. He is also known by the title Agwom Akulu II.

He was reported by The Cable to have been kidnapped on 2 January 2018, in his home at Anchuna and released after the payment of a ransom 10 days after. He is a younger brother to the bishop of Roman Catholic Diocese of Sokoto, Matthew Hassan Kukah.
