= Danjuma =

Danladi
- Gender: Male
- Language: Hausa

Origin
- Word/name: West Africa
- Meaning: Born on Friday

Danjuma // is a masculine name used by the Hausa people of West Africa. In the Hausa language, Danjuma means "born on a Friday". The feminine form is Jummai.

== Notable people with the name ==
- Arnaut Danjuma (born 1997), Dutch professional footballer
- Caroline Danjuma (born 1975), Nigerian actress
- Christopher Danjuma, Nigerian football manager
- Daisy Ehanire Danjuma (born 1952), Nigerian politician
- Danjuma Laah (born 1960), Nigerian politician
- Mohammed Danjuma Goje (born 1952), Nigerian politician
- Theophilus Danjuma (born 1938), Nigerian soldier, politician, multi-millionaire businessman and philanthropist
