= Kamuru =

Kamuru Kamuru
- Town
- Location within Nigeria
- Coordinates: 09°53′N 08°11′E
- Country: Nigeria
- State: Kaduna State
- LGA: Zangon Kataf
- Chiefdom: Akulu

Government
  - Type: Elective monarchy
  - Agwom Akulu: Agwom Yohanna Sidi Kukah, Agwom Akulu II
- Time zone: UTC+01:00 (WAT)
- Climate: Aw

Kamuru (also Kamuru, Kamuru, Kamuru Ikulu) is a town in Zangon Kataf Local Government Area in southern Kaduna state in the Middle Belt region of Nigeria. It is the headquarters of the Akulu chiefdom. The postal code of the area is 802.

== See also ==
- List of villages in Kaduna State
