= Katung Aduwak =

Nigerian film producer, director, screenwriter

- Born: 21 March 1980 (age 46); Zonkwa, Nigeria
- Education: Digital Film Academy, New York
- Occupations: Film producer; Film director; Scriptwriter
- Years active: 2006 - present
- Known for: Winner of the Big Brother Nigeria premier edition
- Spouse: Raven Taylor-Aduwak
- Children: 1

Katung Aduwak (born March 21, 1980) is a Nigerian scriptwriter and TV personality. He is the winner of the premier edition of the Big Brother Nigeria reality TV show aired between March 5 and June 4, 2006. He hails from Zonkwa, Kaduna State, Nigeria and is a scriptwriter, producer and director as well as a graduate of Political Science. He was once a media panelist at the Harvard Africa Business School Forum and served for many years as Senior Channel Manager at MTV Base, Senior Creative Director at VIACOM International and executive director at Chocolate City. He is currently the CEO of One O Eight Media and African Partner for Campfire Media.

== Career ==
=== Big Brother Nigeria ===
The 26-year-old Aduwak was named the winner of the event hosted by Michelle Dede and Olisa Adibua, the very first season on June 4, 2006, with a take home prize of $100,000. 11 years later, he revealed that the key to succeeding in the show was, in his view, being oneself and also being strategic.

=== After Big Brother Nigeria ===
After the reality TV show, Aduwak proceeded to New York to further his education at the Digital Film Academy, graduating with a directorial degree and went into filmmaking. He has gone on to become a filmmaker as well as a reality star TV coach.

=== Filmmaking ===
What was to have been Aduwak's debut film was Heaven's Hell. The actual release date was slated for January 23, 2015. The movie was, however, not released until May 10, 2019. The movie clips were shot in 2012 by One O Eight Media, partnering with BGL and Hashtag Media House and starred Nollywood actors and actresses and Nigerian singer Waje.

In 2020, Aduwak directed a short film exposing the conflict between African Americans and the African diaspora, titled Not Supposed to be Here.

== Personal life ==
Aduwak is married to Raven Taylor-Aduwak and has a son. In 2021, they celebrated 8th wedding anniversary.

== Filmography ==
=== Movies ===
- Unwanted Guest (2011) - Producer
- PUNEET!TV (2012) - Producer and Director
- When Love Happens (2014)
- Heaven's Hell (2019) - Director and Writer
- Not Supposed to Be Here (2020)

=== Music ===
- "Superstar" - by Ice Prince (2011)
