= Bekulu people =

Ethnic group in central Nigeria

Bekulu, Bakulu
Total population
- 50,000 (1998)

Regions with significant populations
- Nigeria

Languages
- Kulu

Religion
- Christianity(95%),African Traditional Religion(5%)

Related ethnic groups
- Adara, Anghan, Bajju, Atyap, Ham, Tarok, Jukun, Efik, Igbo, Yoruba and other Benue-Congo peoples of Middle Belt and southern Nigeria

Bekulu people (or Bakulu; Hausa: Ikulu, Ikolu; Jju: Ba̱yinkrum; Tyap: A̱sunkurum) are a people found in Zangon Kataf, Kachia and Kauru Local Government Areas of southern Kaduna State of Middle Belt, Nigeria. They speak a Plateau language called Kulu. They call their land Akulu.

== Religion ==
A majority of the Bakulu people were reportedly adherents of Christians with 95% of the population. Among the Christians, Independents have 60.0%, Protestants 15.0% and Roman Catholics 45.0%. traditional religion, numbering about 5.5%

== Politics ==
The paramount ruler of the Bakulu people is addressed as "Agwom" (or Agom). The current monarch is His Royal Highness (HRH) Bature Sunday Likoro, Agwom Akulu III, who succeeded HRH Yohanna Sidi Kukah, Agwom Akulu II upon his demise on December 18, 2024. He was a younger brother to Bishop Mathew Hassan Kukah, Bishop of the Roman Catholic Diocese of Sokoto. The Agwom Akulu is the head of the Akulu Traditional Council of Akulu (Ikulu) Chiefdom, whose headquarters is at Fadan Ikulu in Kamuru.

== Land subdivisions ==
The land of the Bakulu people is known as Akulu (Hausa: Ikulu). Ikulu is one of the 11 subdivisions of Zangon Kataf Local Government Area of southern Kaduna State. It is in turn divided into the following:

1. Anchuna
2. Ungwan Akokah
3. Gidan Pate
4. Gidan Zomo
5. Kamaru Ikulu (Kamuru)
6. Kamaru Hausawa (Kamuru)
7. Katul
8. Kamuru Dutse
9. Kolosok (Ungwan Jirayi)
10. Kurmi Biri
11. Ungwan Jada
12. Ungwan Jatau
13. Katul Crossing
14. Ugwan Rana
15. Ungwan Pa (Ashafa Gida)
16. Ungwan Sani
17. Yadai
18. Akupal
19. Ungwan Gauta
20. Ungwan Rimi (Ghidol)
21. Fadan Ikulu (Ansang)
22. Gidan Ali (Ginkpon)
23. Fansil (Antang)
24. Ungwan Makama
25. Ampaga (Boto, Lisuru)
26. Ashafa (Agwenshe)
27. Gidan Bako (Gunyua)
28. Dutsen Bako (Gekon'Unyua)
29. Anzaah

A prominent Bakulu son, Rev. Fr. Matthew Kukah decried in an interview with This Day News that the Bakulu alongside the Anghan are the smaller of the groups in the local government with each having just a ward only despite their numbers.

== Notable people ==
- Bishop Matthew Hassan Kukah, Bishop of Roman Catholic Diocese of Sokoto
- Baba Psalm Duniya Inusa Professor of Paediatric Haematology King's College London, first Ikulu medical doctor and paediatrician, chair, National Haemoglobinopathy Panel, England.
- Late Hon. (Chief) Charles Garba Ali Madaki, Politician, Former Minister Federal Ministry of Works and Housing
- Hon. Ali Wakili, Politician, Former House of Assembly Member, Kaduna State
- Hon. Allahmagani Yohanna, Politician, Former Commissioner Culture and Tourism, KEPA, Local Government and Chieftaincy. The last political appointment was the PPS of the Late His Excellency Patrick Yakowa Kaduna State Governor
- Prof. Joseph Mamman, Ahmadu Bello University, Zaria
- Mr. Ishmail Yusuf Ashafa Asst Director FCDA
- Prof. Abdullahi Musa Ashafa, Former Ag. vice-chancellor (Academic) Kaduna State University, Kaduna
- Prof. Benjamin Chindo, Former Dean Faculty of Pharmacy (Academic) Kaduna State University, Kaduna
- Hon. Ben Bako, Politician, Former commission for Information and Home Affairs, Kaduna State
- Barr. (Chief) Joseph Maimagani, seasoned administrator and lawyer
- Prof. Aje Tokan, Abubakar Tafawa Balewa University, (ATBU) Bauchi
- Professor Stephen Yohanna, Bingham University,Jos.
- Professor Nuhu Gado, Bingham University
