= Chawai =

Chawai Fadan Chawai
- Town
- Location within Nigeria
- Coordinates: 09°57′N 08°36′E
- Country: Nigeria
- State: Kaduna State
- Time zone: UTC+01:00 (WAT)
- Climate: Aw

Chawai (Hausa: Fadan Chawai) is a town east of the headquarters of the Tsam Chiefdom of the Atsam people in Kauru Local Government Area in southern Kaduna state in the Middle Belt region of Nigeria. The postal code of the area is 811.

It is also the centre of the Chawai district of the Tsam Chiefdom. The Chiefdom itself and its people are often called Chawai.

== Transportation ==
=== Air ===
The Yakubu Gowon Airport, Jos (IATA: JOS) is the nearest airport to the town. It is situated 45.3 km southeast of the town. The Kaduna International Airport (IATA: KAD) is 162.7 km northwest of the town, and the Nnamdi Azikiwe International Airport (IATA: ABV), 180.1 km southwest of Chawai.

== Culture in the Chawai Town ==
The culture of the Chawai people is vibrant, spiritual, and deeply woven into their daily lives. It is reflected in their music, traditional clothing, cuisine, and storytelling traditions. Most Chawai people are Christians, and major celebrations such as Christmas, Easter, and New Year are observed with songs, prayers, communal feasts, and family reunions. In contrast, northern Kaduna State is predominantly Muslim, where festivals like Eid al-Fitr and Eid al-Adha are celebrated with similar enthusiasm and community spirit.

== Climate Condition ==
In Chawai, The days are partly cloudy, with skies still (partly) cloudy in the evening before clearing up afterwards. The temperature reaches a high of 30 °C during the day and drop to around 18 °C at night.

== See also ==
- List of villages in Kaduna State
