= Agut Ntswuo =

Samaru Kataf A̱gut Ntswuo Samaru Atyap, Chenkwon
- Town
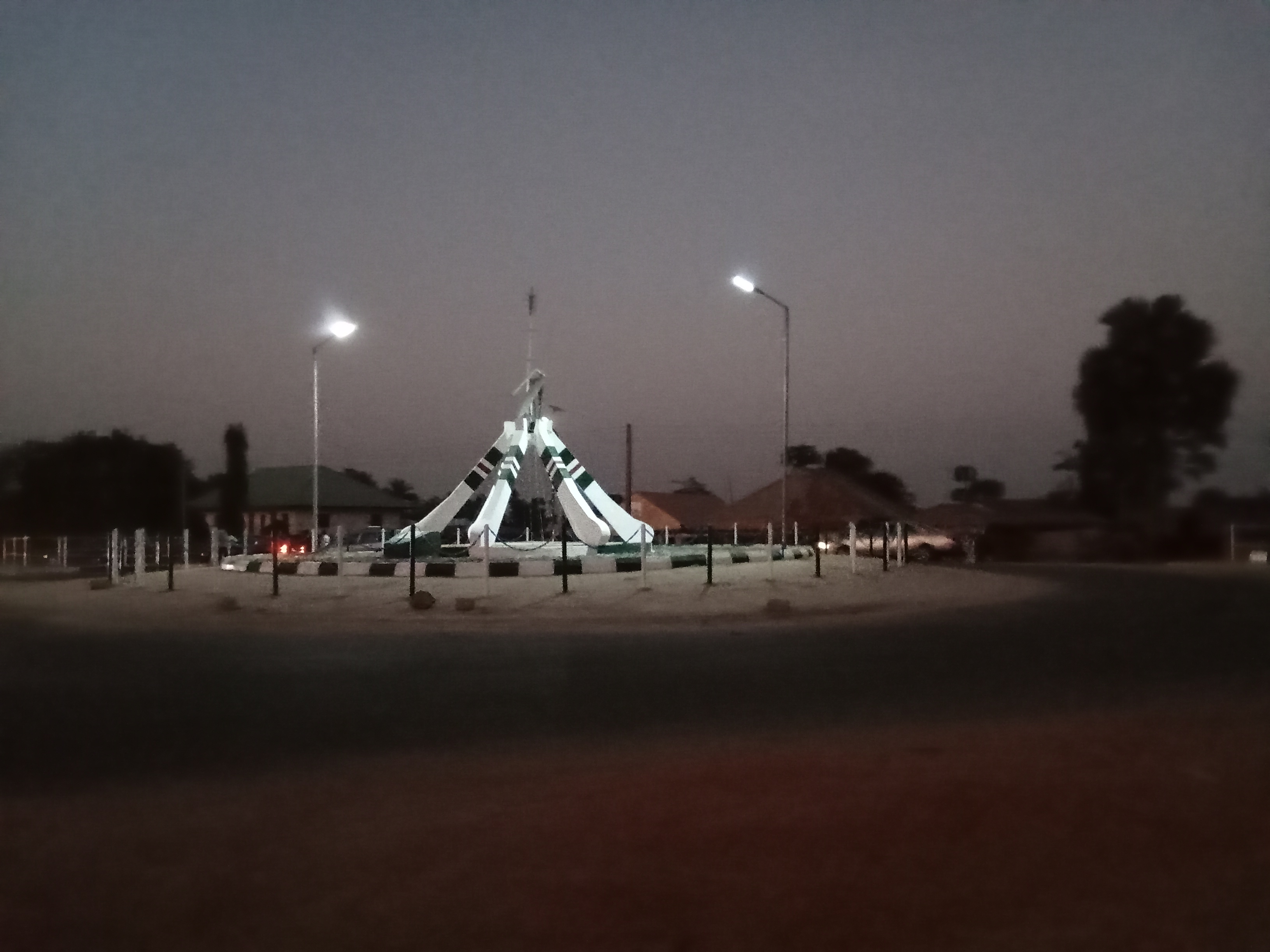
- Chenkwon roundabout at night

- Location within Nigeria
- Coordinates: 09°45′N 08°23′E
- Country: Nigeria
- State: Kaduna State
- LGA: Zangon Kataf
- District: Jei (Unguwar Gaiya)
- Time zone: UTC+01:00 (WAT)
- Postal code: 802
- Climate: Aw

Agut Ntswuo (also Chenkwon or Samaru Atyap; Hausa: Samaru Kataf) is a town in Jei District of Zangon Kataf Local Government Area in southern Kaduna state in the Middle Belt region of Nigeria. The postal code of the area is 802.

== Demographics ==
=== People ===
The dominant people group in the town are the native Atyap people. Other Nigerian people groups can also be found in the town.

=== Language ===
The main language spoken in the town is Tyap language. Other languages spoken include Hausa and English.

== Education ==
In terms of education, the town is home to a Technical College, Tafawa Balewa Memorial Commercial College (founded 1988) and the School of Agricultural Technology, Nuhu Bamalli Polytechnic, at Matakama (Tagama).

== See also ==
- List of villages in Kaduna State
