= Blessing Liman =

- Born: 13 March 1984 (age 42); Zangon Kataf, Kaduna State, Nigeria
- Education: Nigerian College of Aviation Technology
- Military career
- Allegiance: Nigeria
- Branch: Nigerian Air Force
- Service years: 2011-present
- Rank: Military pilot

Blessing Liman (born 13 March 1984), is a Nigerian member of the Nigerian Air Force best known for being Nigeria's first female military pilot.

== Life and education ==
Blessing Liman was born on 13 March 1984 in Zangon Kataf, Kaduna State, Nigeria. Liman attended the Nigerian College of Aviation Technology, after which she enlisted into the Nigerian Air Force in July 2011 and was commissioned on 9 December 2011. On 27 April 2012, she made history by becoming Nigeria's first female combat pilot following the badge decoration ceremony of thirty flying officers by Chief of Air Staff, Air Marshal Mohammed Dikko Umar.

She then said she was ready "to honor the trust that the nation has placed in [her]". Blessing Liman told the Weekly Trust that "women in the Air Force must be given opportunities because they have the potential to become excellent pilots".

== Career ==
At 39, she hailed as the first female captain of the presidential air fleet. In 2023, former Vice President Yemi Osinbajo congratulated her on International Women's Day. For Liman, this achievement represents the fulfillment of a dream she has had since her childhood, a way for her today to speak out on behalf of Nigerian women, whom she is keen to encourage to join the army, convinced that women are just as capable as men of performing the same duties, especially when they have received similar training. Surrounded by 125 male cadets during her training, she acknowledges the challenges she faced, but insists that "all women have the same opportunities to assert their rights in whatever adventure they choose."

Her inspiring journey earned her an interview with Nigerian lifestyle media outlet Glazia as part of Black History Month in 2021, giving her the opportunity to discuss the difficult period following the Nigerian Civil War, marked by prejudice and the social roles assigned to women. However, she highlights the evolution of the Nigerian Air Force, which has worked to change attitudes by opening its doors to women and promoting greater equality and modernity.
