= Kamantan people =

Ethnic group in Nigeria

Anghan
Total population
- 100,000 (1982)

Regions with significant populations
- Kaduna State, Nigeria: 250,000

Languages
- Nghan

Religion
- Christianity, Traditional religion, Islam

Related ethnic groups
- Gwong, Ham, Bakulu, Adara, Bajju, Atyap, Jukun, Efik, Tiv, Igbo, Yoruba, Edo and other Benue-Congo peoples of Middle Belt and southern Nigeria

The Anghan people (Jju: Ba̱byrok, Tyap: A̱byoot, A̱byurok, Hausa: Kamantan) are an ethnic group found in Zangon Kataf and Kachia LGAs of southern Kaduna State, in the Middle Belt area of Nigeria.

== Distribution ==
The Anghan people are mainly found in Zangon Kataf Local Government Area of southern Kaduna State, Nigeria. The Anghan alongside the Bakulu are the smaller of the groups in the local government with each having just a ward only despite their numbers, decried Rev. Fr. Matthew Kukah.

== Religion ==
About 80% of the Anghans are Christian adherents (with Roman Catholics making up 80.0%, Protestants 10.0% and Independent 10.0%), while the other 18.0% of the population is said to practice traditional religion and possibly a few (less than 2%) are Muslims.

== Language ==
The people speak the Nghan language. They also speak Hausa and English languages.

== Kingship stool ==
The Anghan people are primarily found in Anghan Chiefdom and its rulers are known as Ngbiar. The current monarch is His Royal Highness (HRH) Ngbiar Adamu Alkali, Ngbiar Anghan. The chiefdom headquarters is at Fadan Kamantan, Zangon Kataf Local Government Area, Kaduna State.
