= Zangon Kataf =

LGA of Kaduna State, Nigeria

Zangon Kataf Á̱nietcen-A̱fakan Maba̱ta̱do, Mabarado, Katab, Cuttub
- LGA and Town
- Interactive map of Zangon Kataf
- Location within Nigeria
- Coordinates: 9.8°N 8.3°E
- Country: Nigeria
- State: Kaduna State
- Headquarters: Zonkwa

Government
  - Type: Democracy
  - Chairman: Francis Sani Zimbo
  - House of Representative Member: Amos Gwamna Magaji

Area
  - Total: 2,579 km^{2} (996 sq mi)

Population (2006)
  - Total: 318,991
  - Density: 167/km^{2} (430/sq mi)
- 2006 National Census
- Time zone: UTC+1 (WAT)
- Postal code: 802
- ISO 3166 code: NG.KD.ZK

Zangon Kataf (Tyap: Á̱nietcen-A̱fakan, also Katab, Cuttub) is a Local Government Area in southern Kaduna State, Nigeria. Its headquarters is in the town of Zonkwa. It is also a name of a town in the chiefdom of the Atyap. Other towns include: Batadon (Madakiya), Agut Ntswuo (Samaru Kataf), Kamantan, Anchuna and Kamuru. It has an area of 2,579 km^{2} and a population of 318,991 at the 2006 census. The postal code of the area is 802.

== History ==
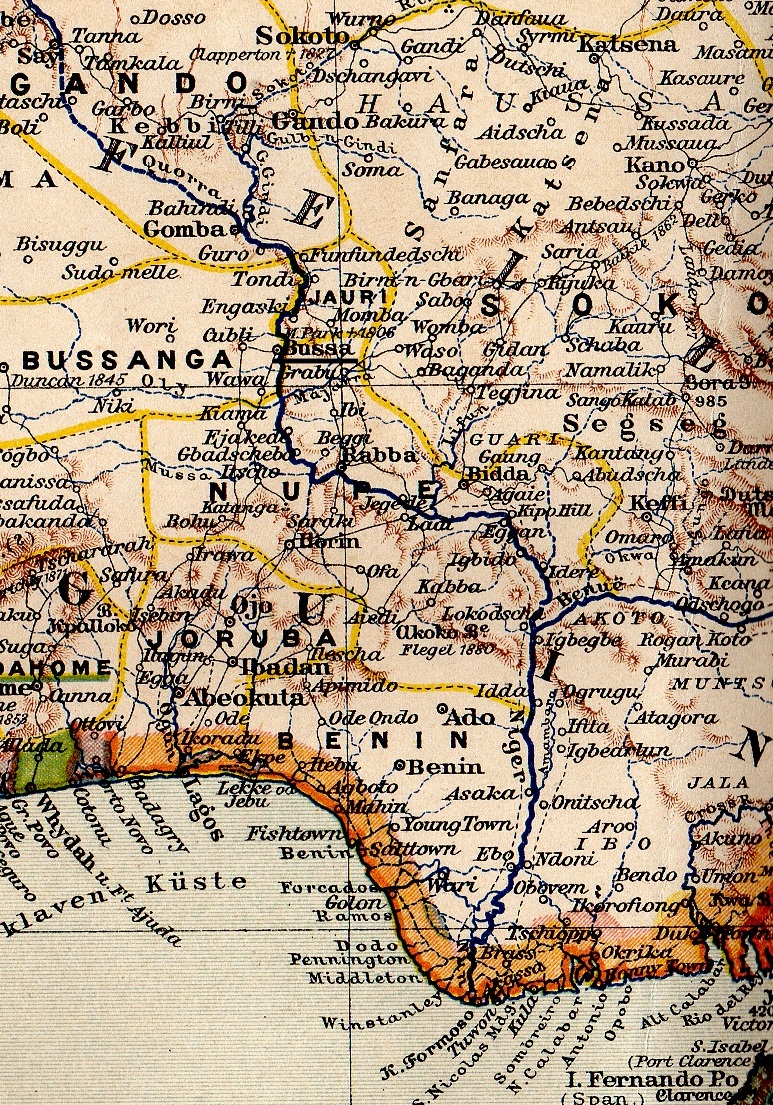
Zangon Kataf labelled Sango Katab in an 1889 German map

Following the creation Kaduna and Katsina from the old North-Central State in 1989, Zangon Kataf LGA was also created from the old Kachia LGA in the same year.

== Geography ==
With an average temperature of 33 degrees Celsius or 91.4 degrees Fahrenheit, Zangon Kataf LGA is 2,668 square kilometres in size. The LGA experiences two different seasons, known as the wet and dry seasons, with an average humidity of 27% in the region.

=== Landscape ===
In Zangon Kataf LGA, the mountain with the highest peak is Kacecere (Atyecarak) Hill with a height of 1,022 metres (3,353 ft) and prominence of 98 metres (322 ft). Other mountains are: Kankada Hill (1007 m/3303 ft), Bako Hill (949 m/3113 ft), Madauci Hill (939 m/3080 ft), Ashafa Hill (856 m/2808 ft), Kabam Hill (814 m/2670 ft), and Antang Hill (742 m/2434 ft). Bako Hill, however, has the highest prominence of 155 m (509 ft).

=== Climate ===
Zangon Kataf town and environs have an average annual temperature of about 24.8 °C (76.6 °F), average yearly highs of about 28.6 °C (83.5 °F) and lows of 18.8 °C (65.8 °F), with zero rainfalls at the ends and beginnings of the year with a yearly average precipitation of about 28.1 mm (1.11 in), and an average humidity of 53.7%, similar to that of neighbouring towns Kagoro and Zonkwa.

Climate data for Katab (2020 data)
| Month | Jan | Feb | Mar | Apr | May | Jun | Jul | Aug | Sep | Oct | Nov | Dec | Year |
|---|---|---|---|---|---|---|---|---|---|---|---|---|---|
| Record high °C (°F) | 31 (88) | 33 (91) | 34 (93) | 34 (93) | 31 (88) | 29 (84) | 26 (79) | 25 (77) | 27 (81) | 29 (84) | 30 (86) | 29 (84) | 29.8 (85.6) |
| Mean daily maximum °C (°F) | 29 (84) | 32 (90) | 34 (93) | 33 (91) | 30 (86) | 27 (81) | 24 (75) | 22 (72) | 24 (75) | 28 (82) | 29 (84) | 31 (88) | 28.6 (83.5) |
| Daily mean °C (°F) | 24 (75) | 26 (79) | 29 (84) | 29 (84) | 26 (79) | 24 (75) | 21 (70) | 20 (68) | 22 (72) | 25 (77) | 25 (77) | 26 (79) | 24.8 (76.6) |
| Mean daily minimum °C (°F) | 15 (59) | 17 (63) | 21 (70) | 22 (72) | 20 (68) | 19 (66) | 18 (64) | 17 (63) | 18 (64) | 20 (68) | 19 (66) | 19 (66) | 18.8 (65.8) |
| Record low °C (°F) | 14 (57) | 16 (61) | 20 (68) | 21 (70) | 21 (70) | 20 (68) | 19 (66) | 18 (64) | 19 (66) | 19 (66) | 18 (64) | 15 (59) | 18.3 (64.9) |
| Average precipitation mm (inches) | 0 (0) | 1 (0.0) | 3.1 (0.12) | 13.5 (0.53) | 35.5 (1.40) | 54.2 (2.13) | 71.2 (2.80) | 69 (2.7) | 60.3 (2.37) | 29.3 (1.15) | 0.1 (0.00) | 0 (0) | 28.1 (1.11) |
| Average precipitation days | 0 | 1 | 4 | 12 | 23 | 28 | 31 | 30 | 29 | 18 | 0 | 0 | 14.7 |
| Average relative humidity (%) | 24 | 18 | 28 | 48 | 66 | 80 | 88 | 90 | 86 | 61 | 32 | 23 | 53.7 |
Source: World Weather Online

== Government and politics ==
=== Boundaries ===
Zangon Kataf Local Government Area (LGA) shares boundaries with Kachia LGA to the west, Kajuru LGA to the northwest, Kauru LGA to the north and northeast, Kaura LGA to the southeast, Jema'a LGA to the south and Jaba LGA to southwest, respectively.

=== Administrative subdivisions ===
The Local Government Area is divided into the following administrative subdivides or electoral wards:

- Atak Nfang ( Zaman Dabo)
- Gidan Jatau
- Ikulu (Bakulu)
- Jei (H. Unguwar Gaya)
- Kamantan (Anghan)
- Kanai (H. Gora)
- Madakiya (J. Bata̱don)
- Unguwar Rimi (J. Za̱nta̱ra̱kpat)
- Zango Urban (T. Nietcen-A̱fakan)
- Zonkwa
- Zonzon

== Cities/towns ==
- Kudan
- Zauro
- Sabon gari kanem
- gidan maga
- Farma
- Angwan maga
- Abet

=== List of council chairmen ===
- Juri Babang Ayok (1989-1992)
- Timmy Kambai
- Elias Manza (2018-2021)
- Francis Sani Zimbo (2021-2024)
- Joseph Bege Gaiya (2024-date)

== Demographics ==
=== Population ===
Zangon Kataf Local Government Area according to the March 21, 2006 national population census was put at 318,991. Its population was projected by the National Population Commission of Nigeria and National Bureau of Statistics to be 430,600 by March 21, 2016.

=== People ===
The people predominantly belong to the Atyap (Nenzit) Ethno-Linguistic group. These people include: the Bajju, Atyap proper, Bakulu, Anghan and A̱tyeca̠rak. There are also the Hausa settler elements and other Nigerian peoples settling among the aboriginal people.

=== Languages ===
The five indigenous people found in the Local Government Area speak related dialects of a common language, Tyap. The largest of them is Jju, closely followed by Tyap proper, then by Kulu, then by Nghan and then by Tyeca̱rak. However, due to the British colonial influence, Hausa language is also widely spoken.

== Culture ==
=== Traditional states ===
There are four chiefdoms in the Local Government Area, namely:

1. Akulu chiefdom, headed by the Agwom Akulu, Agwom Yohanna Sidi Kukah. Headquarters at Kamuru.
2. Anghan chiefdom, headed by Ngbiar Anghan, Ngbiar Adam Alkali. Headquarters at Fadan Kamantan.
3. Atyap chiefdom, headed by the A̱gwatyap (A̱gwam A̱tyap), A̱gwam (Sir) Dominic Gambo Yahaya (KSM). Headquarters at A̠tak Njei, Zangon Kataf.
4. Kajju chiefdom, headed by the A̱gwam Ba̱jju, A̱gwam Nuhu Bature A̱chi (OON). Headquarters at Zonkwa.

=== Cuisine ===
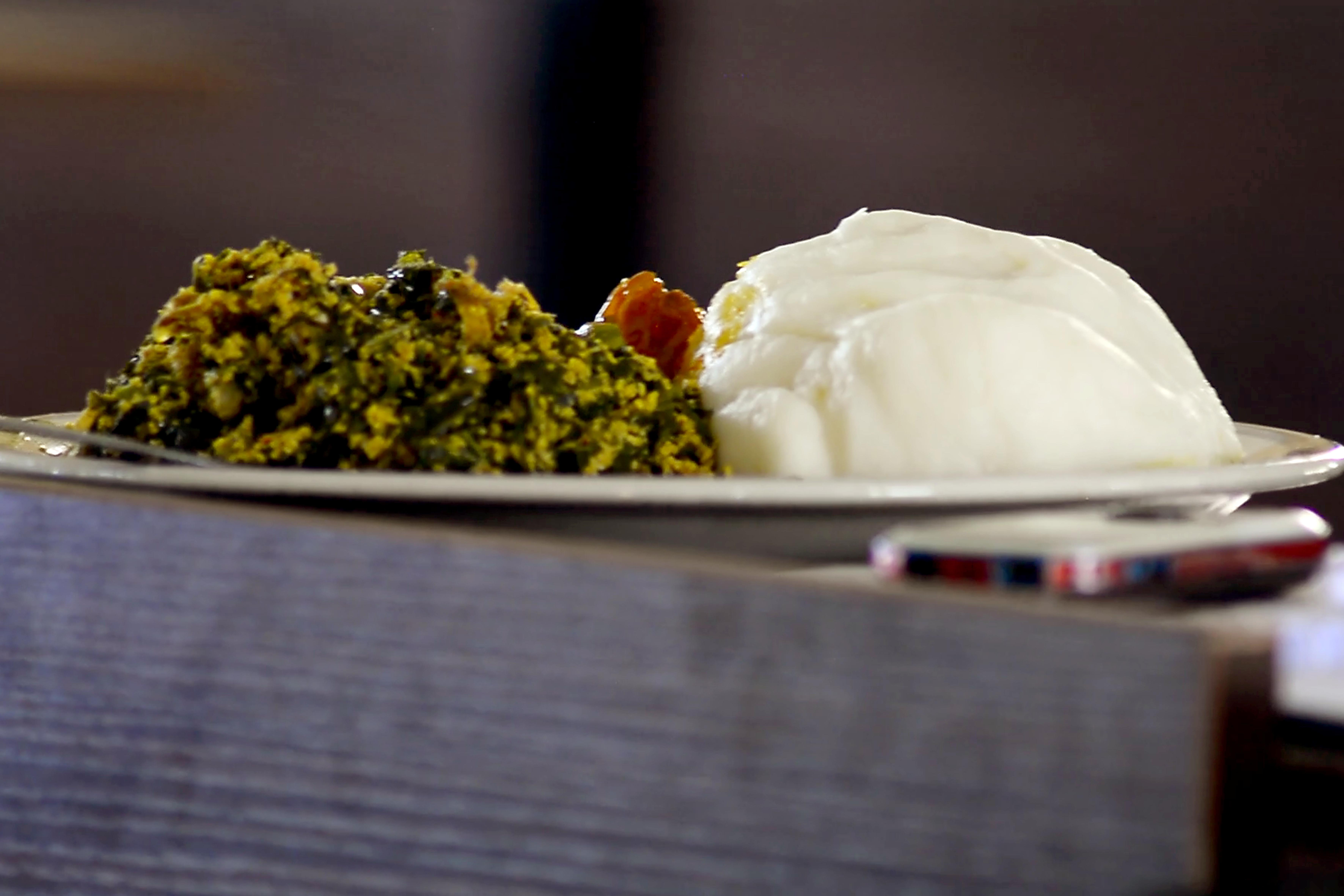
Pounded yam (Tyap: tuk a̱cyi, Jju: tuk dicyi) and egusi soup

The major cultural delicacies enjoyed by the people of Zangon Kataf include:

- Ka̱ti/Kpukpei (a semi-liquid food made from coarse maize flour and vegetables)
- Tuk (flour paste) - which can be eaten with any kind of soup one desires.
- Pork and dog meat are also well consumed in this divide of the earth.

The main non-alcoholic drinks synonymous with this region is known as ta̱bwai tsuntswa in the Tyap tongue (kunu tsuntswa in Hausa).

The region has also for long been synonymous for the brewing of the alcoholic drink known as a̱kan in Tyap proper and Tyeca̠rak, dikan in Jju and burukutu in Hausa, although its brewing has been banned in some areas.

== Notable people ==
- Bala Achi †, historian, writer
- Katung Aduwak, filmmaker
- Rachel Bakam †, entertainer, TV presenter
- Ishaya Bakut †, military service
- Isaiah Balat †, entrepreneur, politician
- DJ Bally, DJ, music producer, voiceover artist, and TV personality
- Nuhu Bature †, paramount ruler
- Musa Bityong †, military service
- Harrison Bungwon †, engineer, paramount ruler
- Bala Ade Dauke †, politician, paramount ruler
- Marok Gandu †, heroic figure
- Sunday Marshall Katung, lawyer, politician
- Toure Kazah-Toure †, historian, activist, pan-Africanist
- Matthew Hassan Kukah, clergy
- Yohanna Sidi Kukah, paramount ruler
- Zamani Lekwot, military service
- Blessing Liman, military service
- Kyuka Lilymjok, lawyer, writer, academic
- Yohanna Madaki †, military service
- Christopher Gwabin Musa, military service
- Ishaya Shekari, military service
- Ayuba Gora Wobin, paramilitary service
- Luka Kogi Yabwat, paramount ruler
- Dominic Yahaya, paramount ruler
- Andrew Yakubu, engineer
- Paul Samuel Zamani, clergy

== See also ==
- List of villages in Kaduna State
- 1992 Zangon Kataf crises
