= List of Southern Kaduna people =

Notable people from Southern Kaduna

List of notable people from Southern Kaduna.

== Journalists and media personalities ==
- Rachel Bakam (1982–2021), journalist
- Beevan Magoni (kcgwiki), journalist, activist

== Traditional rulers ==
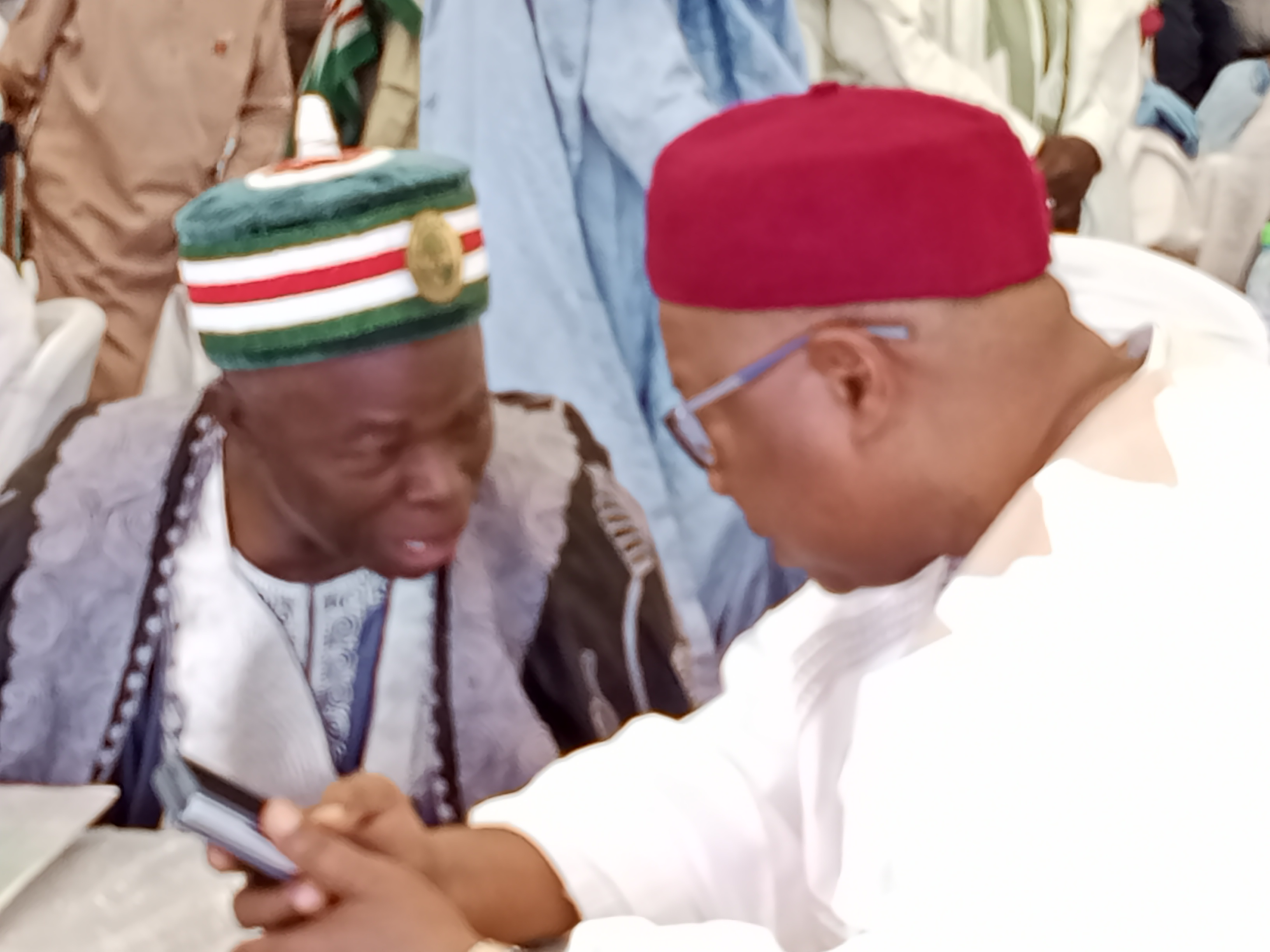
Agwatyap III in December 2023

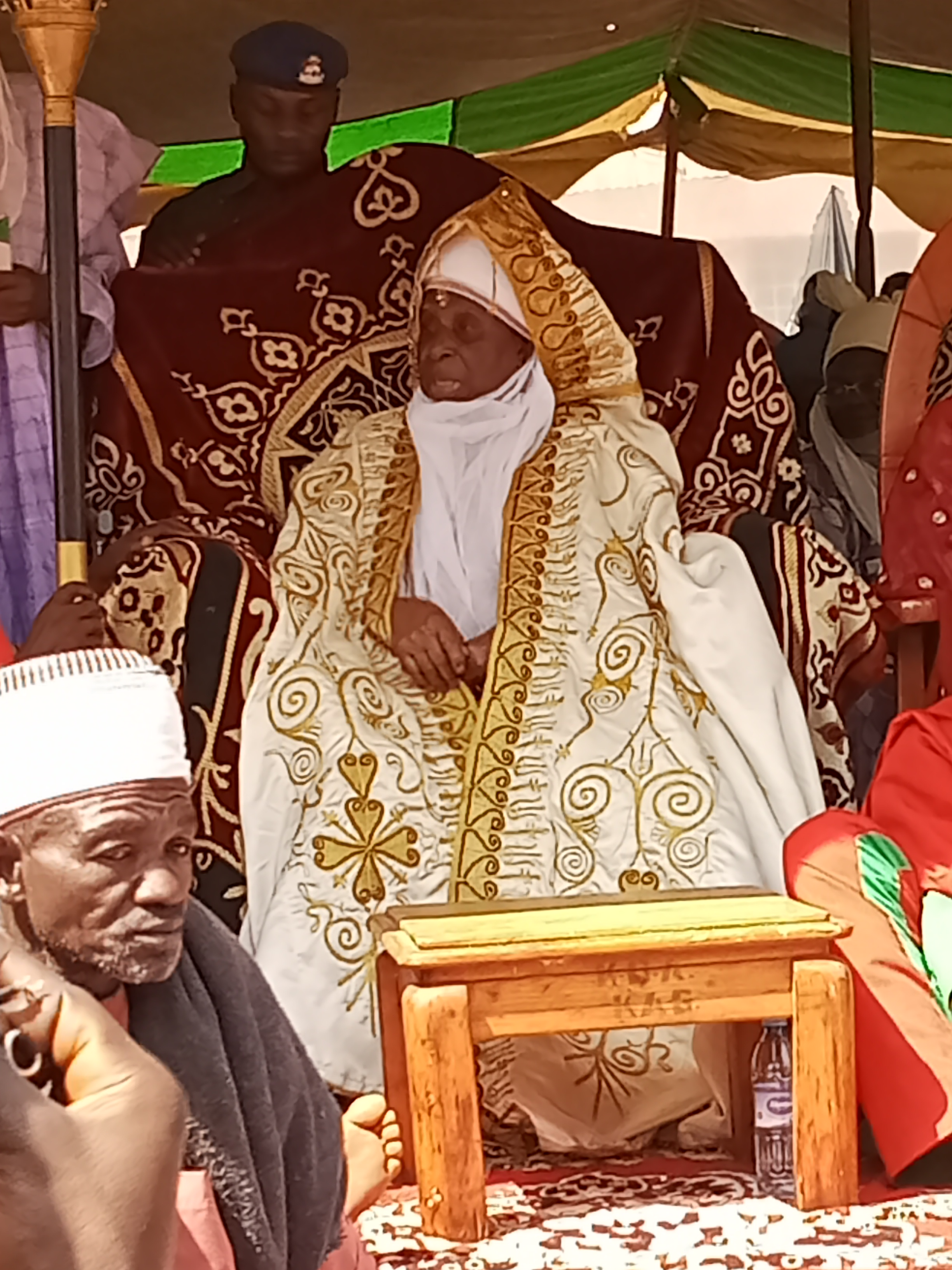
Agwam Agworok VI January 2024

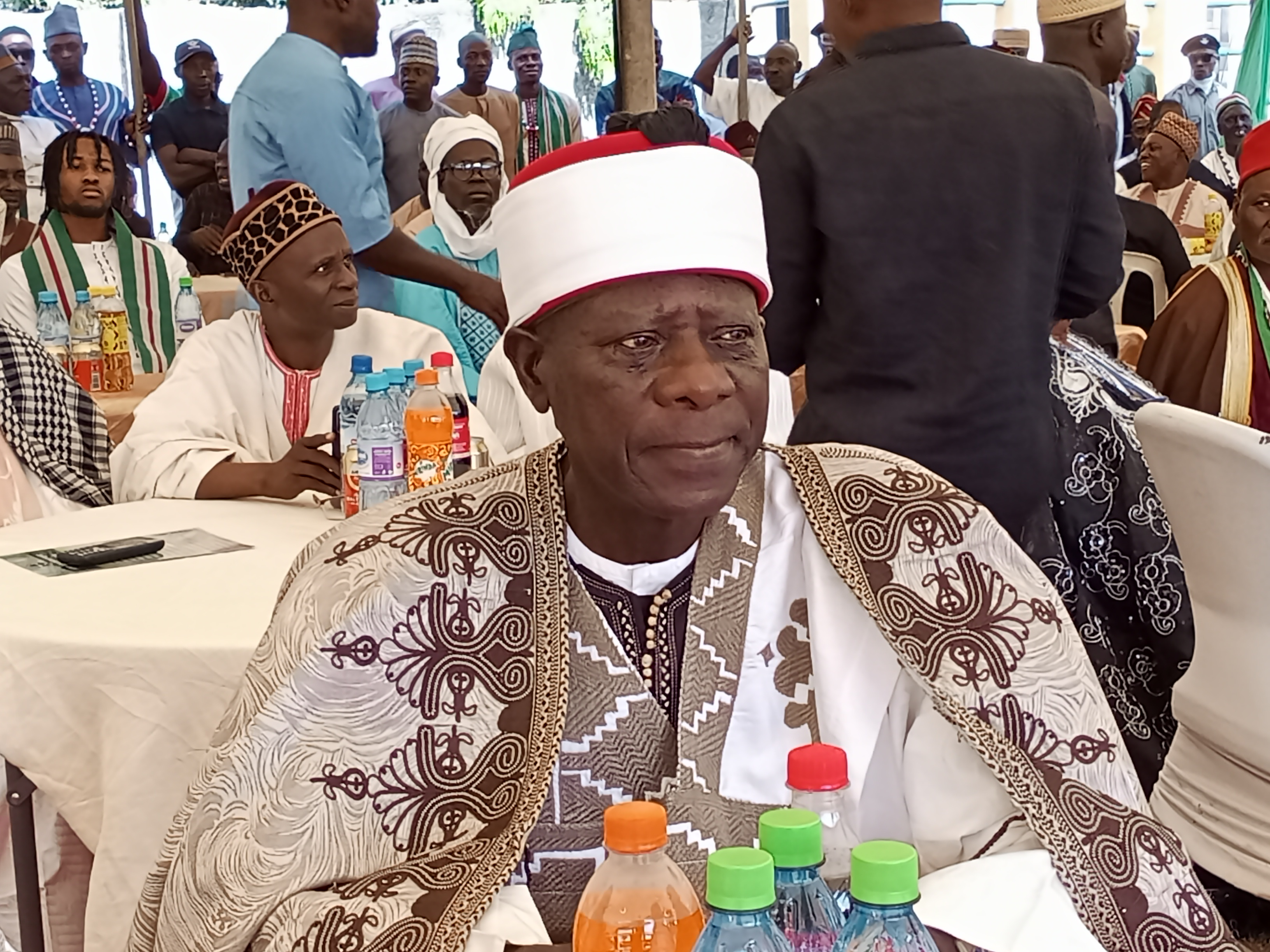
Kpop Gwong II in December 2023

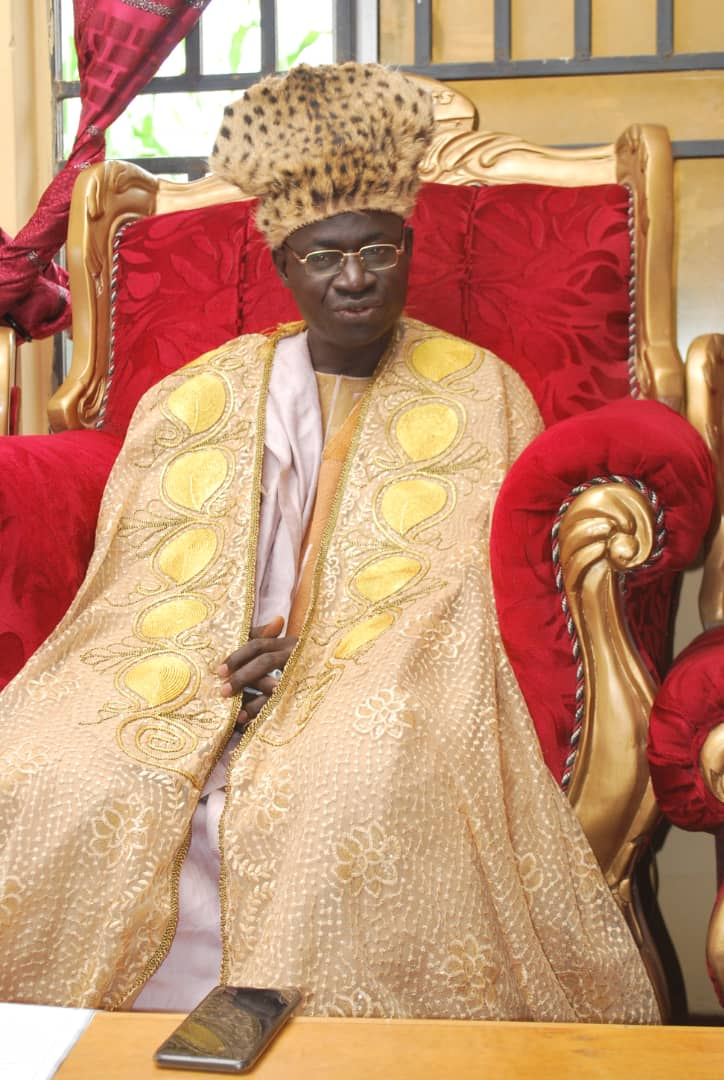
Agwam Fantswam II in 2021

- HH Ere Yohanna Akaito (JP), Ere-Koro I
- HH Agwam (Dr.) Gwamna Awan (1915–2008), Agwam Agworok V
- HH Agwam Nuhu Achi Bature (19??–2021), Agwam Bajju I
- HH Agwam (Dr.) Ufuwai Bonet, Agwam Agworok VI
- HH Agwam (Engr. Dr.) Harrison Yusuf Bungwon (1949–2016), Agwatyap II
- HH Agwam Bala Ade Dauke (1931–2005), Agwatyap I
- HH Agwom Maiwada Raphael Galadima (1954–2018), Agom Adara II
- HH Agwam (Dr.) Josiah Tagwai Kantiyok (b. 1968), Agwam Fantswam II (officially Agwam Zikpak II)
- HH Agwom Yohanna Sidi Kukah (1953–2024), Agom Akulu II
- HH Kpop (Dr.) Jonathan Danladi Gyet Maude (b. 1938), Kpop Ham
- HH Agwam Tagwai Sambo (1936–2024), Agwam Asholyio
- HH Kpop (Col.) Paul Zakka Wyom (rtd.), Kpop Gwong II
- HH Agwam Luka Kogi Yabwat (b. 1954), Agwam Bajju II (officially Agwam Kajju II)
- HH Agwam (Sir) Dominic Gambo Yahaya (b. 1950), Agwatyap III

== Military and paramilitary service ==
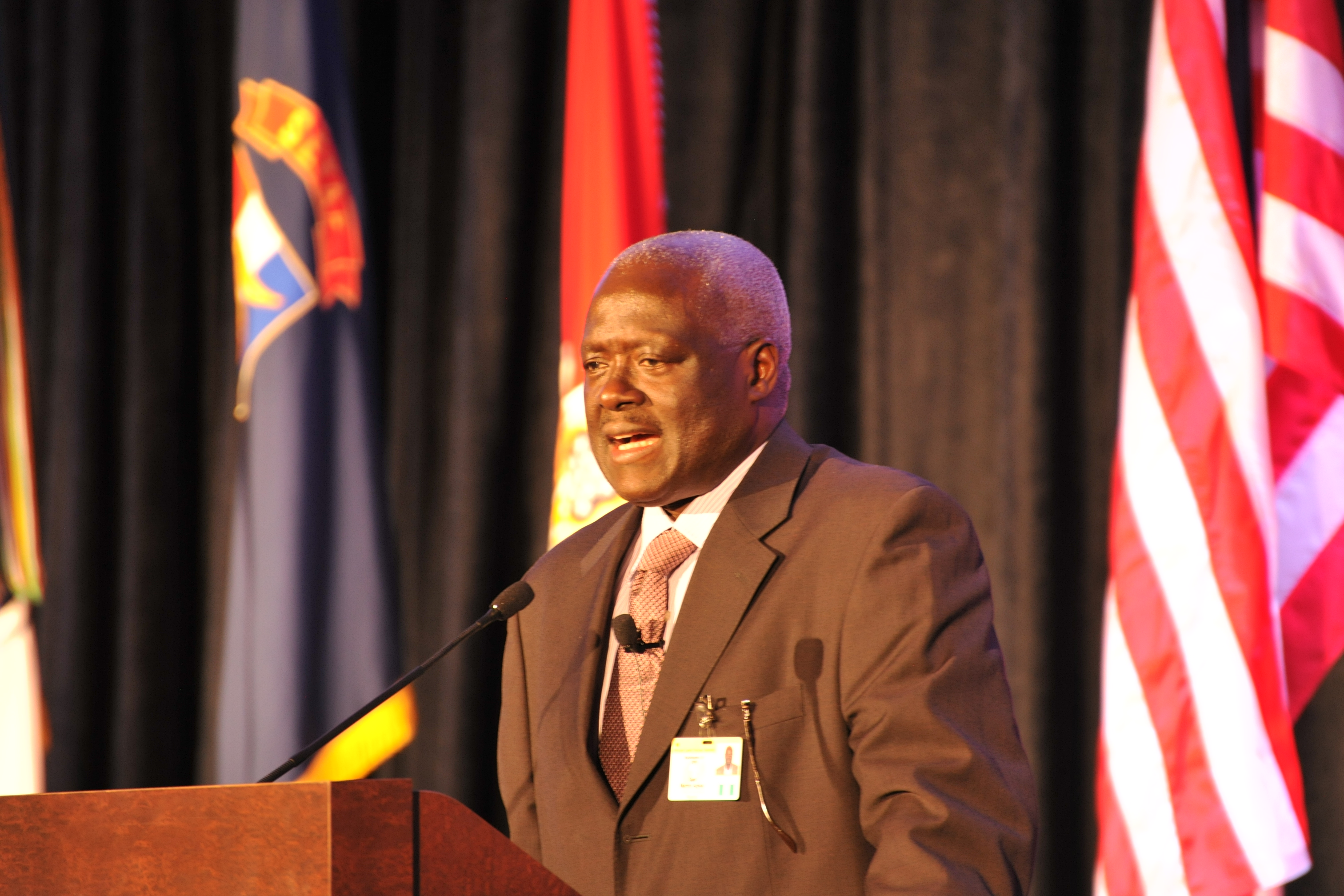
Agwai in May 2010

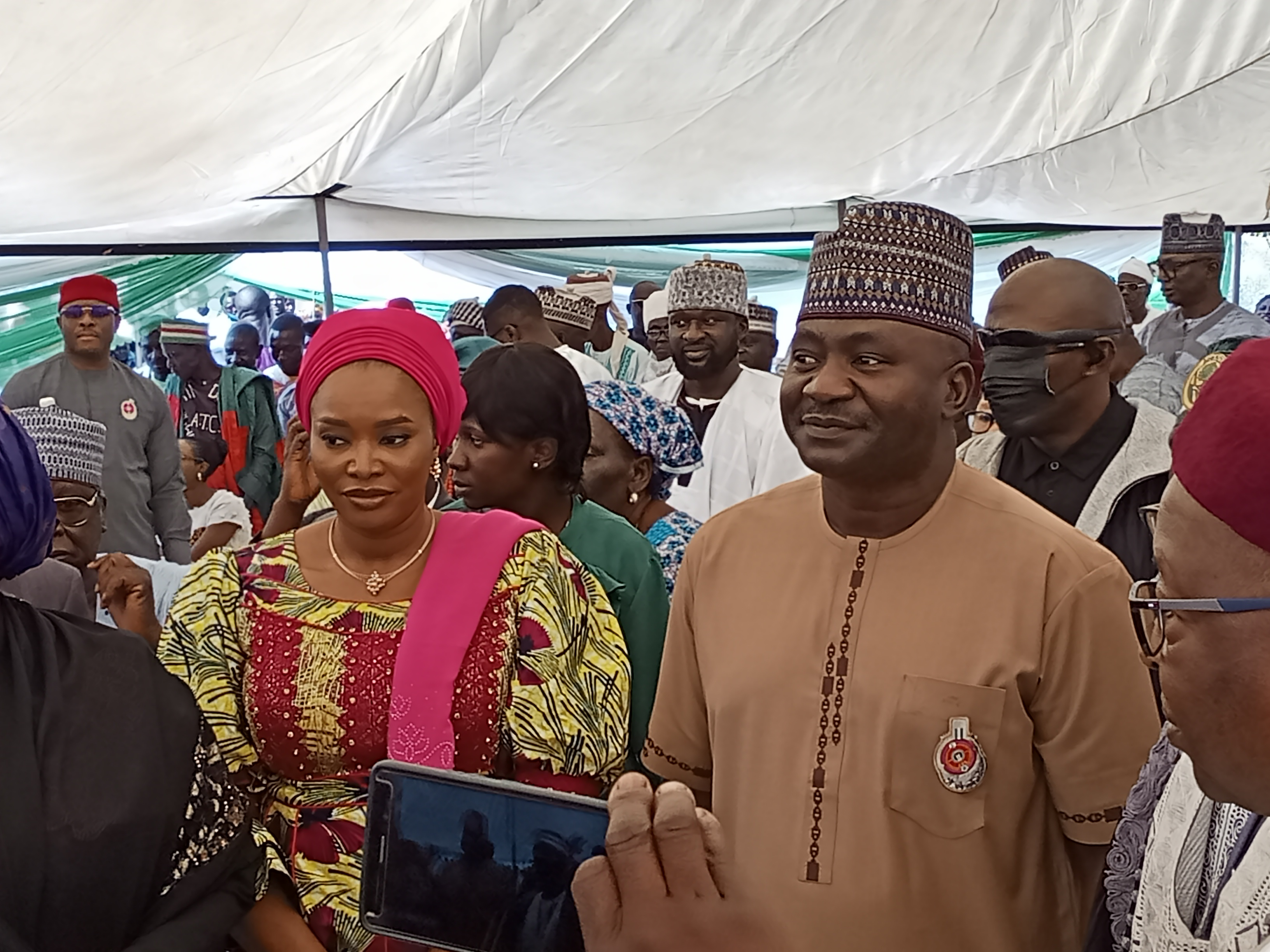
Musa in December 2023

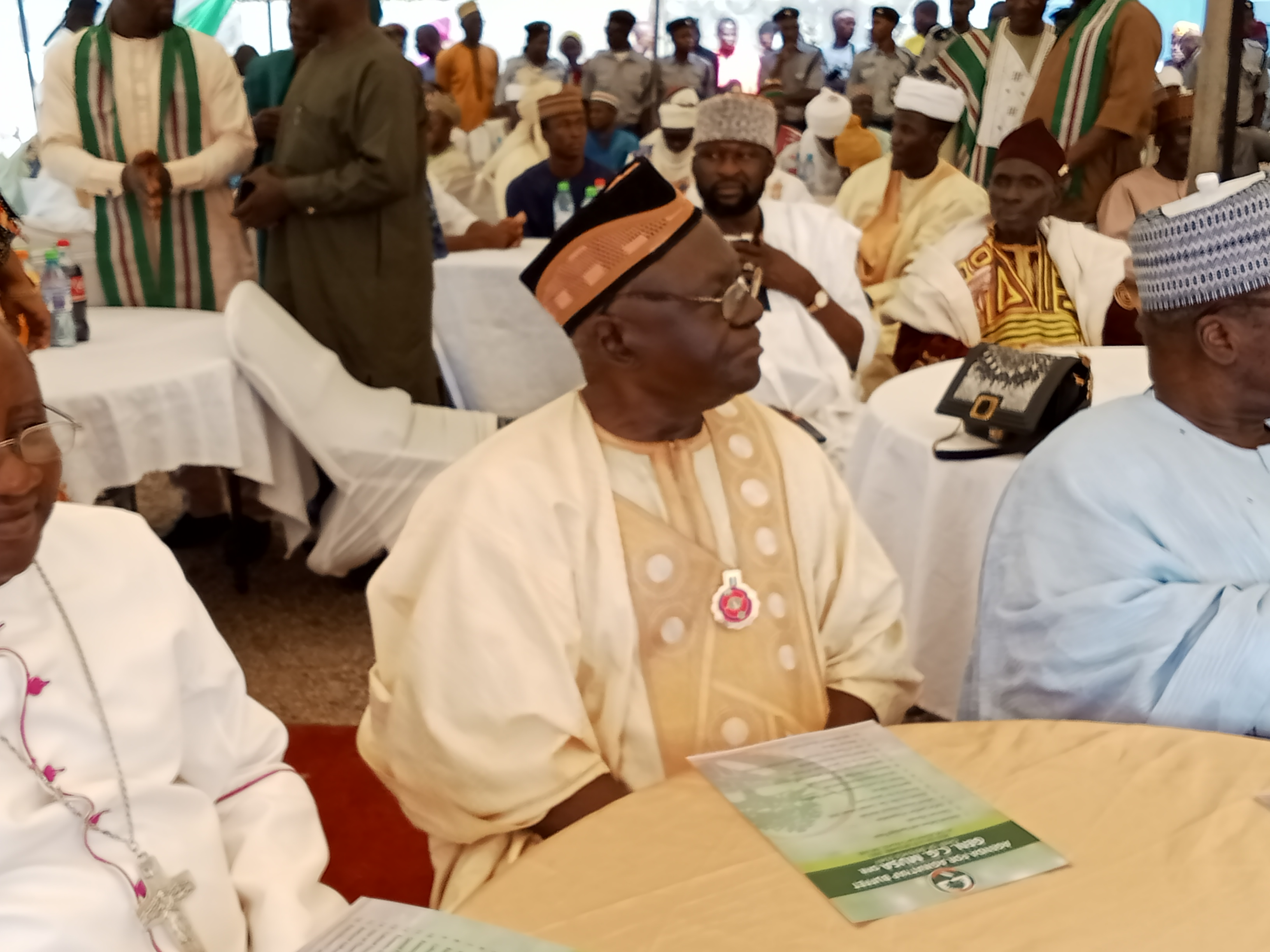
Lekwot in December 2023

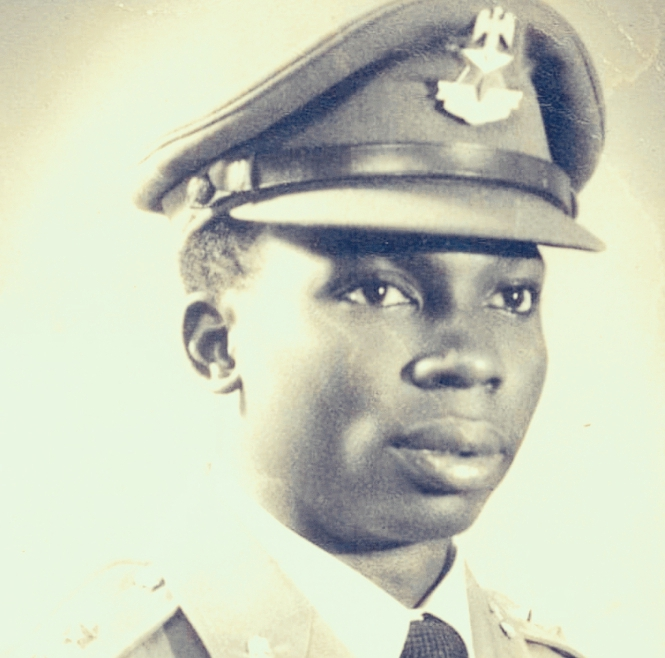
Musa Bityong

- Martin Luther Agwai (b. 1948), Nigerian Chief of Defence Staff (2006–2007); Chief of Army Staff (2003–2006); Commander, UNAMID (2008–2009)
- Samuel Atukum (b. 1950), Military Governor Plateau State (1990–1992)
- Ishaya Bakut (1947–2015), Military Governor Benue State (1984–1985), Commander ECOMOG Peacekeeping Force (Liberia) (1991–1992)
- Musa Bityong (194?–1985), one of the first Nigerian Army officers to be airborne qualified, alleged shooter of Nigeria's Military Head-of-state Gen. Johnson Aguiyi-Ironsi and Western Region governor Lt. Col. Adekunle Fajuyi during the 29 July 1966 coup
- Yohanna Dickson (1950–2015), Military Governor Taraba State (1993–1996)
- Ishaya Iko Ibrahim (1952–2022), Nigeria's 18th Chief of Naval Staff (2008–2010)
- Yohanna Kure (19??–2023), Minister of Culture and Social Welfare (1990–1992), Minister of Sports (1992–1993)
- Zamani Lekwot (b. 1944), Military Governor Rivers State (1975–1978)
- Blessing Liman (b. 1984), Nigeria's 1st female military pilot
- Joshua Madaki (1947–2003), Military Governor Bauchi State (1987–1990), Plateau State (1990–1992)
- Yohanna Madaki (1941–2006), Military Governor Gongola State (1985–1986), Benue State (Aug. 1986–Sept. 1986)
- Usman Mu'azu (1942–2008), Military Governor Kaduna State (1984–1985)
- Christopher Gwabin Musa (b. 1967), Chief of Defence Staff (2023–2025)
- Ishaya Aboi Shekari (b. 1940), Military Governor Kano State (1978–1979)
- Ayuba Gora Wobin, Secretary to Nigeria's Federal Road Safety Commission (2022–2023)
- Paul Zakka Wyom, forced-retired colonel in the Nigerian Army
- Luka Nyeh Yusuf (1952–2009), Nigeria's Chief of Army Staff (2007–2008), Chief of Staff of the Armed Forces of Liberia (2006–2007)

== Academics, educationists and writers ==
- Bala Achi (1956–2005), academic, historian
- Raquel Kasham Daniel, writer
- Toure Kazah-Toure (1959–2017), academic and writer
- Adamu Kyuka Usman Lilymjok (b. 1965)
- Andrew Nkom (b. 1943), professor
- Andrew Jonathan Nok (1962–2017), professor of biochemistry
- William Barnabas Qurix (b. 1961), university administrator, educationist, and researcher

== Economists and bankers ==
- Adamu Audu Maikori (1942–2020), banker, Nigeria Merchant Bank
- Obadiah Mailafia (1956–2021), economist, deputy governor Central Bank of Nigeria
- Esther Nenadi Usman (b. 1966), banker, Nigerian Minister of Finance (2006–2007)

== Clergy ==
- Joseph Bagobiri (1957–2018), Bishop Kafanchan Roman Catholic Diocese (1995–2018)
- Chris Delvan Gwamna (b. 1960), presiding pastor King of All Kings Church of the Capstone
- Matthew Hassan Kukah (b. 1952), Bishop of Roman Catholic Diocese of Sokoto
- Emmanuel Nuhu Kure, gospel minister and televangelist, pastor Throneroom (Trust) Ministries
- Paul Samuel Zamani (b. 1964), Bishop Anglican Diocese of Kwoi

== Politicians ==
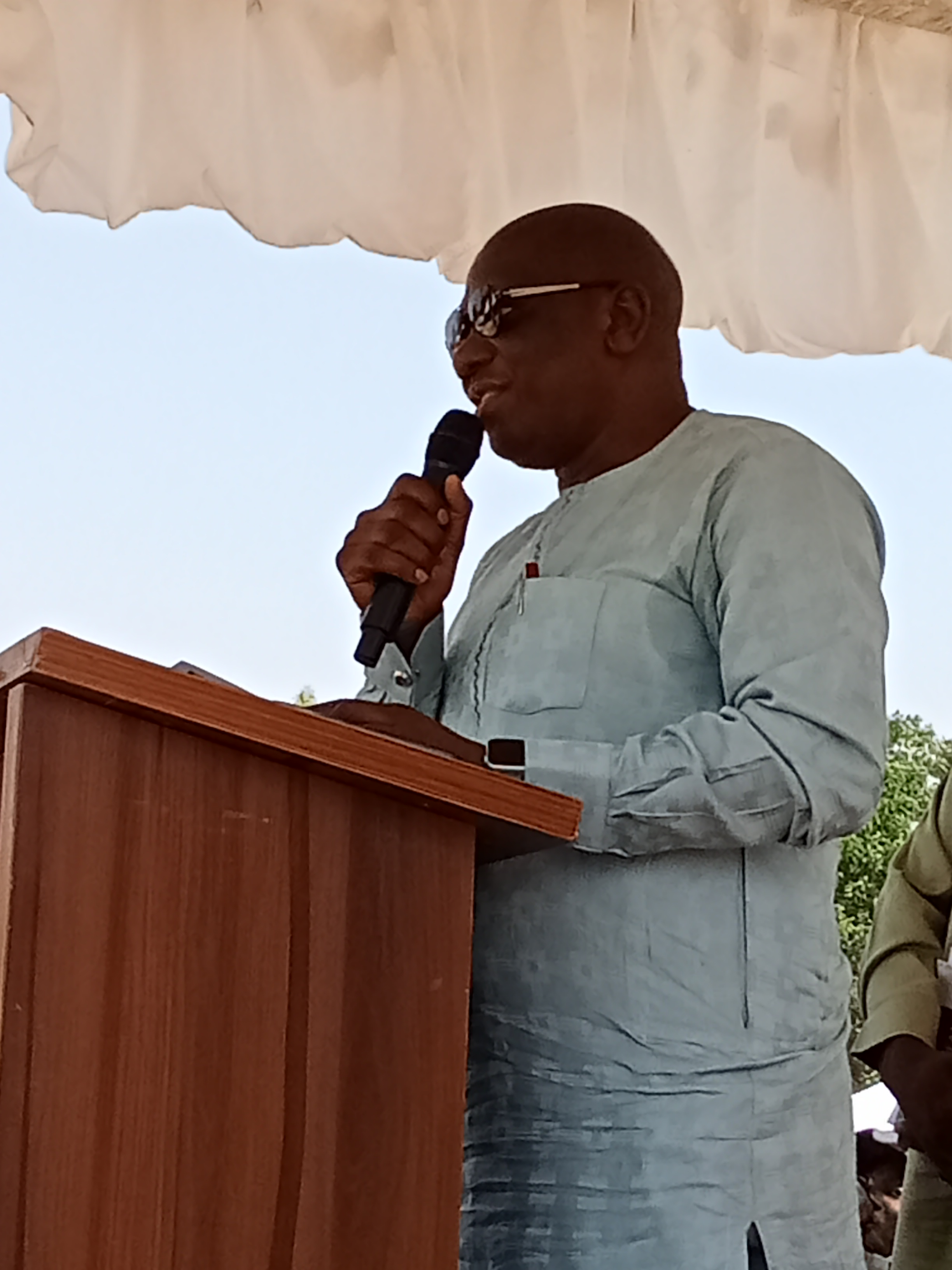
Katung, SM in January 2024

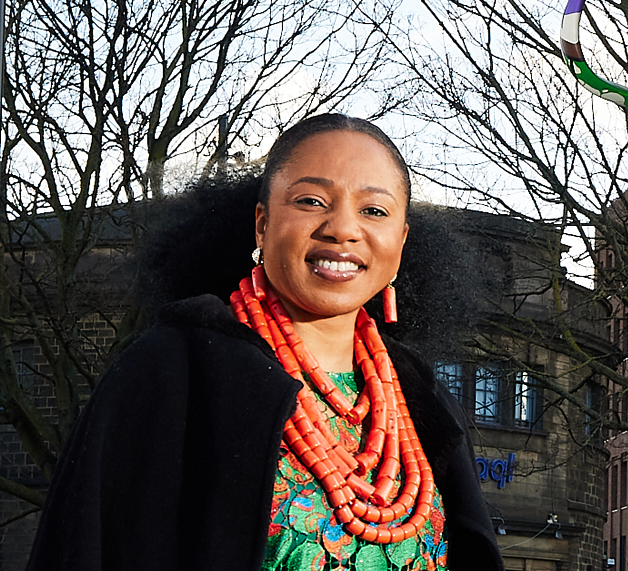
Katung, AM in 2003

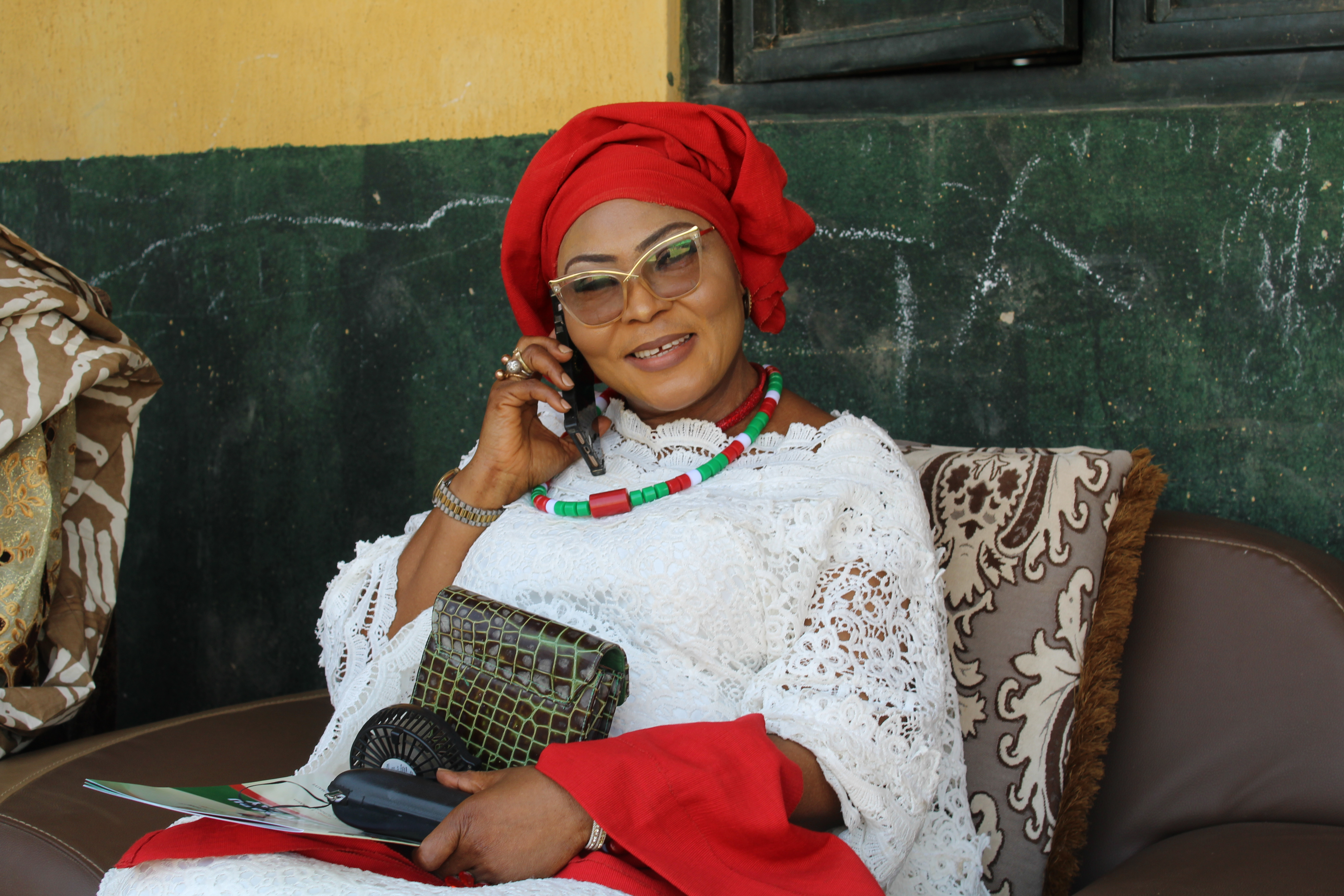
Ango in November 2024

- Ekene Abubakar Adams (1985–2024), member of the House of Representatives (Nigeria) for Chikun/Kajuru federal constituency (2023–2024)
- Comfort Amwe, representative in the Kaduna State House of Assembly
- Ruth Jummai Ango (b. 1971), member of the House of Representatives (Nigeria) for Zangon Kataf/Jaba federal constituency (2003–2007)
- Jonathan Asake (b. 1965), Labour Party candidate for 2023 Kaduna State gubernatorial election
- Isaiah Chawai Balat (1952–2014), minister of works and housing (state) (1999–2003); senator representing Kaduna South senatorial district (2003–2007); governorship candidate, Kaduna State, in the 2006 gubernatorial PDP primary election
- Harrison Yusuf Bungwon (1949–2016)
- Bala Ade Dauke (1931–2005), Northern People's Congress (NPC) candidate for Zangon Kataf constituency in the 1959 Northern House of Representatives, Kaduna polls
- Mathew Donatus (b. 1988), member of the House of Representatives (Nigeria) for Kaura constituency (2023–date)
- Joseph Gumbari (b. 1957), member of the House of Representatives (Nigeria) for Kauru Federal Constituency (2003–2011)
- Gideon Lucas Gwani, member of the House of Representatives (Nigeria) for Kaura constituency (2019–2023)
- Abigail Marshall Katung (b. 1973), 1st African Lord mayor of Leeds (2024–2025)
- Sunday Marshall Katung (b. 1961), member of the House of Representatives (Nigeria) for Zangon Kataf/Jaba Federal Constituency (2015–2019); senator representing Kaduna South senatorial district (2023–date)
- Danjuma Laah (b. 1960), senator representing Kaduna South senatorial district (2015–2023)
- Amos Gwamna Magaji (b. 1971), member of the House of Representatives (Nigeria) for Zangon Kataf/Jaba constituency (2019–date)
- Adamu Audu Maikori (1942–2020), candidate in the 1990 Kaduna State governorship primary election; candidate for the senatorial seat for Kaduna South senatorial district (2003 and 2007)
- Obadiah Mailafia (1956–2021), candidate of the African Democratic Congress (ADC) in the 2019 Nigerian presidential polls
- Lawrencia Mallam, Minister of Environment (2014–2015)
- Stephen Shekari (kcgwiki) (1948–2005), deputy governor of Kaduna State (1999–2005)
- Esther Nenadi Usman (b. 1966), senator representing Kaduna South senatorial district (2011–2015)
- Dominic Gambo Yahaya (b. 1950), caretaker chairman of Kaduna North Local Government Area (1994–1996)
- Patrick Ibrahim Yakowa (1948–2012), 1st governor of Kaduna State from Southern Kaduna (2010–2012)
- Caleb Zagi (b. 1960), senator representing Kaduna South senatorial district (2007–2011)

== Legal professionals ==
- Sunday Marshall Katung (b. 1961), lawyer
- Adamu Kyuka Usman Lilymjok (b. 1965), lawyer
- Yohanna Madaki (1941–2006), engaged in a prolonged legal battle to save Major General Zamani Lekwot from execution (1992–1996)
- Adamu Audu Maikori (b. 1942), first professional lawyer in Southern Kaduna
- Audu Maikori (b. 1975), lawyer
- Yahaya Maikori, lawyer

== Activists ==
- Jonathan Asake (b. 1965), SOKAPU National President (2019-2022), human rights activist
- Lois Auta (b. 1980), disabilities right activist, founder Cedar Seed Foundation
- Luka Binniat (kcgwiki), human rights activist, former SOKAPU spokesman
- Toure Kazah-Toure (1959–2017), pan-Africanist, human rights activist
- Matthew Hassan Kukah (b. 1952), human rights activist
- Adamu Kyuka Usman Lilymjok (b. 1965), human rights activist

== Filmmakers and actors ==
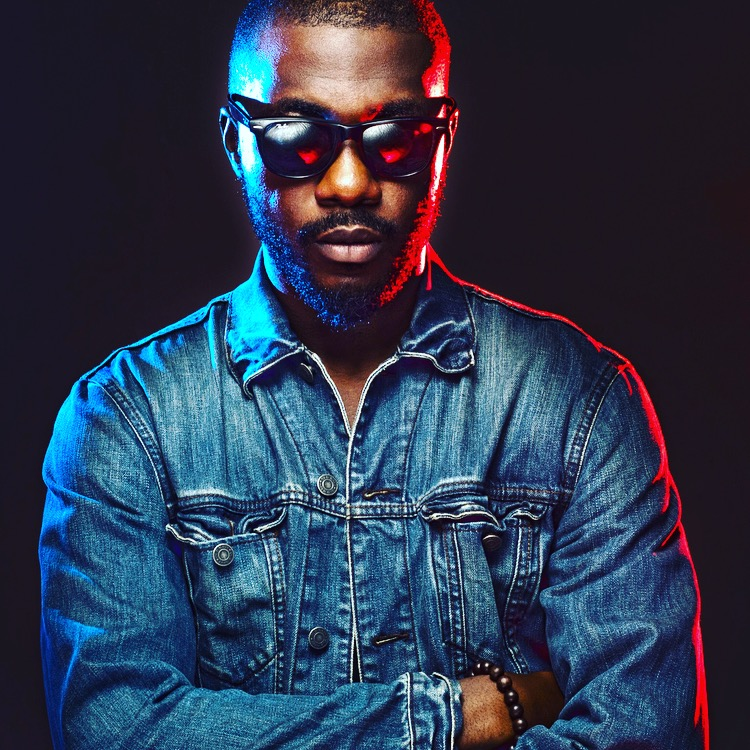
DJ Bally c. 2017

- Katung Aduwak (b. 1980), winner Big Brother Naija premier edition (2006); film director, screenwriter, producer
- Ishaya Bako (b. 1986), film director, screenwriter
- DJ Bally, disc jockey, house member Big Brother Naija 2017
- Toka McBaror, film director, screenwriter
- Jane Thomas Rogers (eswiki), actress

== Business entrepreneurs and professionals ==
- Isaiah Chawai Balat (1952–2014), founder Gora Nigeria Limited and CB Finance Group
- Danjuma Laah (b. 1960), hotelier
- Audu Maikori (b. 1975), co-founder Chocolate City (record label)
- Yahaya Maikori, co-founder Chocolate City (record label)

== Musicians ==
- Joe El, afrobeat artiste
- Chris Delvan Gwamna (b. 1960), gospel singer
- Eddie Hick (b. 1987), British drummer, percussionist, composer and record producer
- Skales (b. 1991), afrobeat artiste

== Science and technology ==
- Harrison Bungwon (1949–2016), engineer and scientific adviser, Defence Industries Corporation of Nigeria (198?–19??)
- Josiah Tagwai Kantiyok (b. 1968), consultant and chief executive of the Veterinary Council of Nigeria (2009–2020)
- Andrew Jonathan Nok (1962–2017), professor of biochemistry, researcher and winner of the Alexander Humboldt Prize and (2013); discovered the gene responsible for the synthesis of sialidase
- Andrew Laah Yakubu (b. 1955), engineer and Group Managing Director of the Nigerian National Petroleum Corporation (2012–2014)

== Sports figures ==
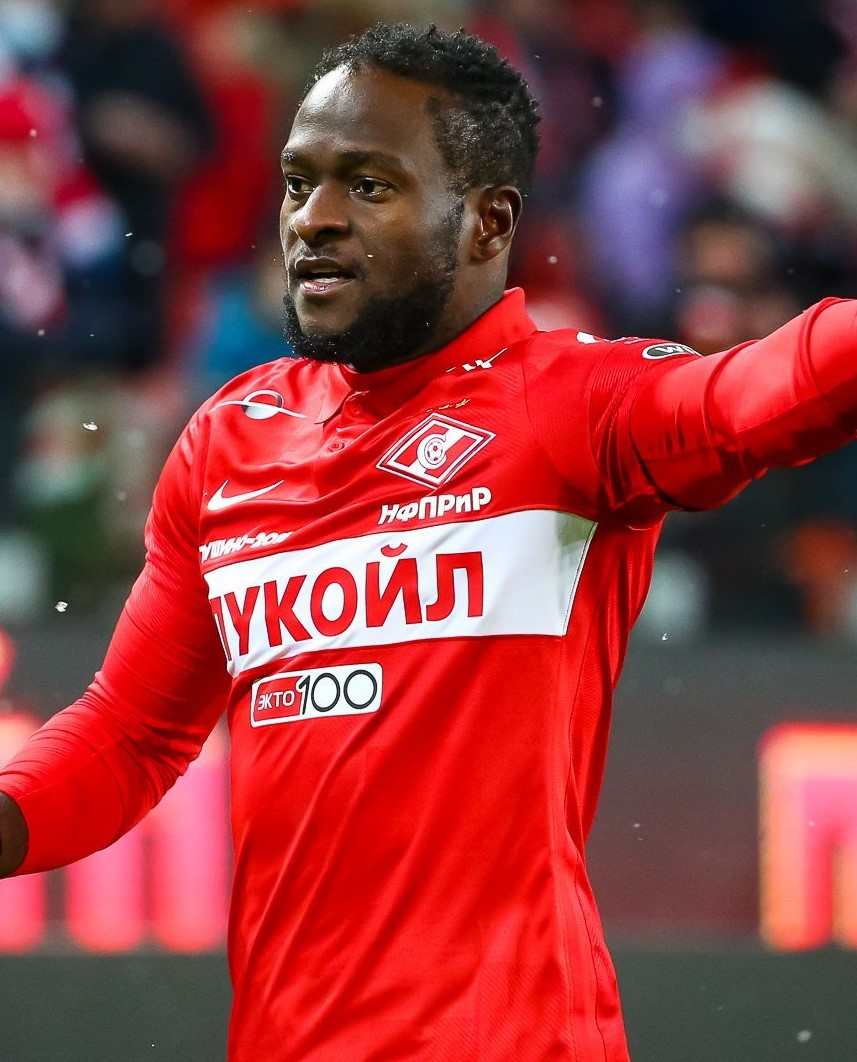
Moses in 2021

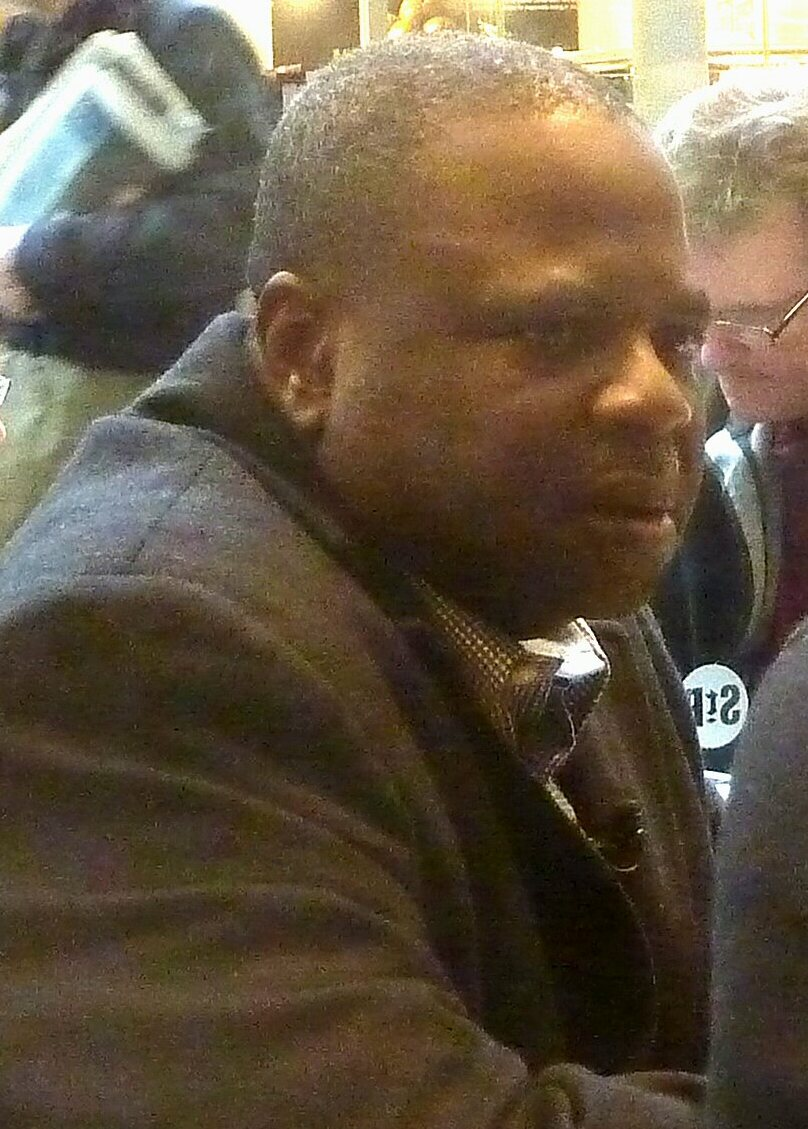
Adamu in 2010

- Mozes Adams (b. 1988), footballer
- Amos Adamu (b. 1952), sports administrator
- George Bisan (b. 1992), footballer
- Victor Moses (b. 1990), footballer
- Josiah Timothy Tinat (b. 1985), hockey player
- Mathew Yakubu (b. 1999), footballer

== Fashion and beauty ==
- Binta Sukai, Miss Nigeria (1990)

== Other ==
- Marok Gandu of Magata (18??–1902), anti-slavery fighter
