= Kagoma =

Kagoma may refer to:

- Alternate name for the Gyong language
- Kagoma, Nigeria, rural settlement of many villages in Jema'a Local Government Area, southern Kaduna state in the Middle Belt region of Nigeria.
