= Shadalafiya =

Shedalafiya Nkui
- Town
- Location in Nigeria
- Coordinates: 9°24′0″N 7°54′0″E
- Country: Nigeria
- State: Kaduna State
- LGA: Kagarko
- District: Kosheng (Kurmin Jibril)
- Time zone: UTC+1 (WAT)

Shadalafiya (Nkui) is a town in Kagarko Local Government Area of southern Kaduna State, Nigeria. The Shadalafiya people speak the Koro Wachi language.

Economy

Shadalafiya is one of the district of Kagarko Local Government Area. Its primary activities are agriculture (farming) and trading.

== Climate ==
Kaduna State has tropical wet-and-dry season
