= BQV =

BQV or bqv can refer to:

- Koro Wachi language, spoken in Nigeria
- Bartlett Cove Seaplane Base, an airport in Bartlett Cove, Alaska; see List of airports in Alaska

== See also ==
- $Ev = Bqv$, an equation stating that a particle feels equal electric and magnetic forces; see Mass-to-charge ratio
