= Gwong people =

Nigerian ethnic group

Gwong
Total population
- 45,000

Regions with significant populations
- Nigeria

Languages
- Gyong

Religion
- Christianity

Related ethnic groups
- Anghan, Ham, Nyankpa, Bajju, Tinor, Atyap, Berom, Jukun, Efik, Tiv, Igbo, Yoruba, Edo and other Benue-Congo peoples of Middle Belt and southern Nigeria

Gwong people (Hausa: Kagoma) are a people found in the southern part of Kaduna State, Nigeria. Their language, Gyong language belongs to the central plateau language group. Their headquarters is at Fadan Kagoma, Jema'a Local Government Area of the state.

== Distribution ==
The Gwong people are mainly found in Jema'a Local Government Area of southern Kaduna State, Nigeria.

== Religion ==
The Gwong people are predominantly Christians who make up about 78.00% of the population (of whom Protestants number about 60.00%, Roman Catholics 20.00% and Independent 20.00%). The remaining 22.00% of the overall population being adherents of traditional religion.

== Politics ==
The Gwong people's realm is called Gwong Chiefdom and its rulers are known by the appellation Kpop. The current monarch is His Royal Highness (HRH) Col. Paul Zakka Wyom (rtd.), Kpop Gwong II.

HRH Paul Wyom conferred an eighteen year old Briton with a traditional title for building a health centre

== Notable people ==
- Bishop Joseph Danlami Bagobiri, late catholic bishop of Kafanchan.
- Victor Moses, footballer
- Sir Patrick Ibrahim Yakowa (late), first civilian governor of Kaduna State from Southern Kaduna.
- Lt. Gen. Luka Nyeh Yusuf (late), former Nigerian Chief of Army Staff.
