= Jere =

Jere may refer to:

- Jere, Borno, a Local Government Area in Nigeria
- Jere, Kaduna State, a town in Nigeria
- Jere, West Virginia, United States, an unincorporated community
- Jere language, a Nigerian dialect cluster
- Jere (name), a list of people with the masculine given name or surname
