= Gurara Dam =

Multipurpose dam in Kaduna State, Nigeria

- Location within Nigeria Location within Africa
- Location: Kagarko, Kaduna State, Nigeria
- Coordinates: 09°36′50″N 07°41′31″E
- Owner: Federal Government of Nigeria

Dam and spillways
- Type of dam: Gravity dam
- Impounds: Gurara River

Power Station
- Turbines: 6
- Installed capacity: 360 MW (480,000 hp)
- Annual generation: 1,130 GWh

Gurara Dam, also known as the Gurara Multipurpose Dam, is located about 360 km south of the Gurara River. The dam is bounded by the Federal Capital Territory to the south, Niger State to the west, and by the Kachia Local Government Area of Kaduna State to the north, as well as the Kakargo Local Government Area of Kaduna State to the East.

== Description ==
Gurara Dam is located at Awon, in the Kachia Local Government Area of Kaduna State, Nigeria. It was designed to provide water, support electricity, and boost agriculture, especially around the Abuja - Kaduna region. The Gurara Dam area falls within Latitudes 9°13'N and 9°39' and Longitudes 7°26'E and 7°42'E, an area approximately 150 km^{2}.

Gurara Dam is situated along the Gurara River at 9°05'N, 7°30'E. The river flows from the north-east towards the south-west, and towards the south through Abuja.

The Dam has a tunnel that is around 1.16 kilometres, with a tower that is 42 metres high. The Dam's structure is built to be aroumd 8,000,000 cubic metres, 3.1 kilometres long, and 52.5 metres deep. It is built with hydraulic valves to enable it transfer water through pipes to Abuja and it environs. The original purpose of the Dam is to supply water to the lower Usman dam, through the conveyance of pipeline.

== Operations ==
=== Socio-economic impacts ===
One of the socieconomic impacts of Gurara Dam is that it supplies water to the Lower Usman Dam through a 75 km pipeline. This raises the Federal Capital Territory's water treatment capacity. Also, a 30MH hydro power plant was completed in 2014 from the Dam. It also supports the Azare-Jere irrigation scheme, where farmlands were allocated to local communities to support irrigational farming.

=== Challenges ===
Studies on Gurara Dam have raised concerns about it long term safety. Rapid, unplanned urban growth in the water shed, combined with rising rainfall and temperatures from climate change, has increased the amount of water flowing into the reservoir, rising the risk of structural failure. Modelling of a potential dam breach suggests that a large area downstream, including the town of Jere and it surrounding villages, could be flooded, along with the dam's 6000-hecter irrigation scheme that supports local food production.
