= Iddah, Kaduna State =

Iddah Ida
- Ward and village
- Location within Nigeria
- Coordinates: 09°25′07″N 07°21′03″E
- Country: Nigeria
- State: Kaduna State
- LGA: Kagarko
- Time zone: UTC+01:00 (WAT)
- Climate: Aw

Iddah, or Ida is a ward and a village of Kagarko Local Government Area in southern Kaduna State in the Middle Belt region of Nigeria. The postal code of the area is 802.

== Education ==
- Government Senior Secondary School (GSSS), Iddah

== See also ==
- List of villages in Kaduna State
