= Kubacha =

Kubacha Uhucha, Uhuca
- Town
- Nickname: KBC
- Motto(s): Home of revenue Generation and business
- Location within Nigeria
- Coordinates: 09°26′N 07°48′E
- Country: Nigeria
- State: Kaduna State
- LGA: Kagarko
- Chiefdom: Koro

Government
  - Type: Elective Monarchy
  - Ere-Koro: Ere Yohanna Akaito (JP)
- Elevation: 645.39 m (2,117.4 ft)
- Time zone: UTC+01:00 (WAT)
- Climate: Aw

Kubacha (Tinor: Uhucha, JimUhuca) is a town in Kagarko Local Government Area as well as the Koro Chiefdom headquarters, in southern Kaduna State in the Middle Belt region of Nigeria. The town has a post office

== Climate/Geography ==
At an elevation of 645.39 m (2,117.4 ft) above sea level, Kubacha has a tropical wet and dry climate (Classification: Aw). The annual temperature is 28.75 °C (83.75 °F) and it is -0.71% lower than Nigeria’s averages. Kubacha typically receives about 93.49 mm (3.681 in) of precipitation and has 133.32 rainy days (or 36.53% of the time) annually.

== See also ==
- List of villages in Kaduna State
