= Kagarko =

Kagarko Wɔgɔŋ Wogong
- LGA and Town
- Nickname: Garin Bubu
- Interactive map of Kagarko
- Location in Nigeria
- Coordinates: 9°27′0″N 7°41′0″E
- Country: Nigeria
- State: Kaduna State

Government
  - Executive Chairman: Nasara Auza Rabo
  - Vice chairman: Mustapha Gidado

Area
  - Total: 2,356 km^{2} (910 sq mi)

Population (2006)
  - Total: 239,058
  - Density: 137/km^{2} (350/sq mi)
- Time zone: UTC+1 (WAT)
- Postal code: 802
- ISO 3166 code: NG.KD.KG
- Website: www.kagarkolocalgovernment.com

Kagarko (Tinɔr: Wɔgɔŋ or Wogong) is a town and Local Government Area in southern Kaduna State of Nigeria. It has an area of 2,356 km^{2} and a population of 239,058 at the 2006 census. The Local Government Council is chaired by Nasara Rabo. The postal code is 802.

== Boundaries ==
Kagarko Local Government Area (LGA) shares boundaries with Kachia LGA to the north, Jaba LGA to the east; Paikoro and Gurara LGAs to the west and Tafa LGA to the southwest all of Niger State; Bwari LGA of the FCT; and Karu LGA of Nasarawa State to the south, respectively.

== Administrative subdivisions ==
Kagarko Local Government Area consists of 10 subdivisions (second-order administrative divisions) or electoral wards, namely:

1. Aribi
2. Iddah
3. Jere North
4. Jere South
5. Kagarko North
6. Kagarko South
7. Katugal (Ator)
8. Kukui
9. Kurmin Jibrin (Kosheng)
10. Kushe

It also comprises about eleven districts, which are:

1. Shadalafiya (Nkui)
2. Katugal
3. Kushe
4. Jere
5. Dogon Kurmi (Uner)
6. Kenyi
7. Kurmin Dangana
8. Kubacha (Uhuca)
9. Aribi
10. Kagarko districts.

== People ==
The people are predominantly farmers. The Batinor (Koro) people is the dominant group in the area. Others are Gbagyi, Ham, Hausa and Adara. They are very hard working and mostly farmers, about 70% of ginger produced in Kaduna State is from Kagarko. In 2023, an outbreak of a fungal disease destroyed much of the ginger crop in Kagarko and neighbouring local government areas of southern Kaduna State, with about 95 per cent of the ginger grown in the state that year reported lost.

== Climate ==
The climate is warm to hot throughout the year, with the wet season being oppressive and overcast and the dry season being mild and partly cloudy.

=== Average Temperature ===
The average daily maximum temperature during the 2.4-month hot season, which runs from January 31 to April 12, is above 33 °C (91 °F). March is the hottest month in Kagarko, with an average high temperature of 34 °C (94 °F) and low temperature of 21 °C (69 °F). The 3.6-month chilly season, which runs from June 19 to October 5, has daily highs that are typically lower than 28 °C (82 °F). December is the coldest month in Kagarko, with an average low temperature of 15 °C (59 °F) and high temperature of 31 °C (87 °F).

=== Geography ===
The Kagarko Local Government Area has an average temperature of 33 degrees Celsius (91.4 degrees Fahrenheit) with a total area of 1864 square kilometres. The Local Government Area has two distinct seasons: the dry season and the rainy season. The average humidity in the region is 39%.

== Traditional stools ==
Kagarko consists of three chiefdoms:

1. Kagarko Chiefdom: Headed by the Sarkin Kagarko, Alh. Sa'ad Abubakar, with headquarters in Kagarko Town
2. Jere Chiefdom: Headed by the Sarkin Kagarko, Dr. Sa'ad Usman (OFR) with headquarters in Jere.
3. Koro Chiefdom: Headed by the Ere-Koro, Ere Yohanna Akaito (JP), with headquarters in Uhucha;
