= Emmanuel Nuhu Kure =

Nigeria Gospel preacher

- Born: Kaduna State, Nigeria
- Occupation: Christian clergyman
- Known for: Founder of the Throneroom (Trust) Ministry
- Title: Apostle

Emmanuel Nuhu Kure, also known as Apostle (Dr.) Emmanuel Nuhu Kure is a Nigerian Gospel minister and televangelist - featuring on Dove TV. He is the founder and president of the prayer and Christian missionary oriented ministry, The Throneroom (Trust) Ministry, having branches within Nigeria and abroad, including the United States of America, Cameroon, Niger, Indonesia and the United Kingdom, and headquarters in Kafanchan, Kaduna State, Nigeria. He was the National Secretary of the Pentecostal Fellowship of Nigeria (PFN).

== Biography ==
Kure is a graduate of Bayero University Kano(BUK) and served as a Senior Lecturer at the Kaduna State College of Education, Kafanchan, but later resigned to go into Christian ministerial work. He envisioned and pioneered the Throneroom Ministry with branches in Nigeria and other African countries, the UK and the USA. He is, as of 2020, the National Secretary and member of the National Advisory Board of the Pentecostal Fellowship of Nigeria (PFN); Chairman, Advisory Council of Wailing Women Worldwide; Chairman, Salama Radio 98.1FM; Member, Board of Trustees, Redeemer's University Nigeria; Member International Coalition of Apostles. He was the National Coordinator for Associate Travelling Secretaries and Senior Friends for Nigeria Fellowship of Evangelical Students; Council Member and Chapter Coordinator for Calvary Ministry; and Ambassador and Convening Apostle for Dr. C. Peter Wagner's Global Spheres International for Africa. He also features on Dove TV.

In November 2018, he was the guest speaker at the annual breakfast prayer session organised by the Nigerian National Assembly Christian legislators’ prayer breakfast fellowship with the Nigerian president, Muhammadu Buhari, Speaker of the House of Representatives, Yakubu Dogara, and others in attendance.

He was listed by YNaija in December 2018 as one of the 100 most influential Christian ministers in Nigeria.

In August 2020, he cautioned the Federal Government to intervene on the attacks and killings in Southern Kaduna with urgency before it leads to a revolution.

In September 2020, he was one of the Christian clergies invited for the inauguration of House of Kaduna Family by the Kaduna State governor, Nasir el-Rufai, as he sues for peace through leaders of faith in the state.

== Publications ==
- The Watchman (2020)
- Practical Prophetic Prayer and Warfare: Pulling Down STRONGHOLDS (2020)
- God's Chosen Leader: A Man After God's Heart (2021)
