= Lawrencia Mallam =

Nigerian environmentalist

Lawrencia Laraba-Mallam
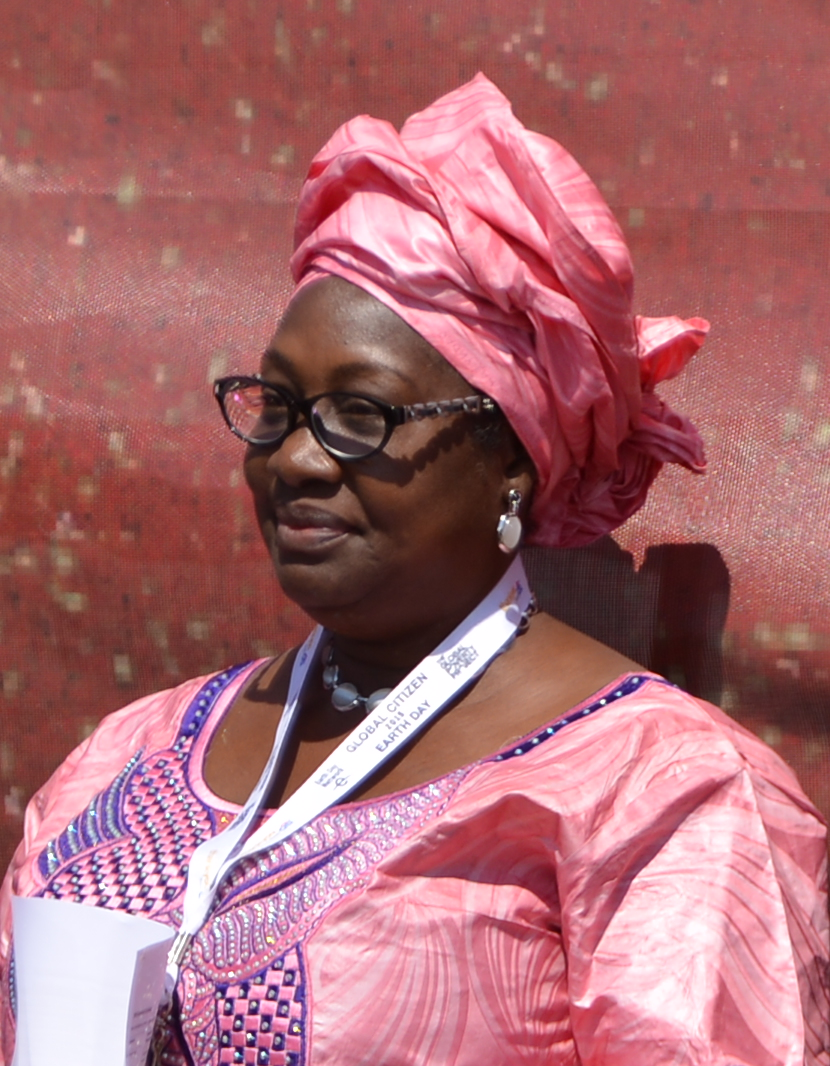
- Laraba-Mallam in 2015

Minister of Environment
- In office 5 March 2014 – 29 May 2015
- President: Goodluck Jonathan
- Succeeded by: Amina Mohammed

National president, Catholic Women Organization (CWO)

Personal details
- Born: Nigeria
- Citizenship: Nigeria
- Spouse: Pius Mallam

Lawrencia Laraba-Mallam is a former Nigerian Minister of Environment between 2014–2015. She was one of the 12 ministers sworn in by President Goodluck Jonathan in March 2014. She was succeeded by Amina Mohammed. Before her appointment as a minister, she served as the National President, Catholic Women Organization (CWO).

== Ministerial career ==
During her tenure, the National Great Green Wall (GGW) bill was passed, to provide the legal architecture for projects aimed at cushioning the effects of desertification and related ecological issues. For that, the sum of ₦16 billion was released by the Presidency in September 2014, for the kickstarting of the project.

Speaking after the introduction of the Gas Flare Tracker website by the United Kingdom's Department for International Development, which tells how much gas was being flared across the Niger Delta, in November 2014, Mallam said,

Anytime we attend foreign conferences, you know, we hear other countries tell the amount of gas released into the atmosphere, but we guess. But from today, we will not guess, we will give the correct amount, because of this tracker.

== Kidnap and release ==
On 3 October 2016, Lawrencia and her 73-year-old husband, Pius Mallam, were kidnapped in Jere, along the Kaduna-Abuja expresaway. They, however, regained their freedom about 48 hours after the incident.
