= Joseph Gumbari =

Nigerian politician

Joseph M. Gumbari

Member of the House of Representatives
- In office 2003–2011
- Constituency: Kauru Federal Constituency

Personal details
- Born: August 1957 (age 68) Kaduna State, Nigeria
- Party: Peoples Democratic Party (PDP)
- Occupation: Politician

Joseph M. Gumbari is a Nigerian politician born in August 1957 in Kaduna. He represented the Kauru Federal Constituency in the 5th National Assembly from 2003 to 2007 and again from 2007 to 2011. He previously served in the State House of Assembly from 1999 to 2003 under the Peoples Democratic Party (PDP). He holds a Bachelor of Arts degree from the University of Jos.
