= Toure Kazah-Toure =

Nigerian historian, activist, pan-Africanist and writer (1959 - 2017)

- Born: 1959; Northern Region, British Nigeria
- Died: 1 July 2017 (aged 57–58); Nigeria
- Education: Ahmadu Bello University (ABU), Zaria
- Occupations: Historian, Academician, Writer, pan-Africanist
- Parent: Kazah Yashim (father)

Toure Kazah-Toure (1959 - 1 July 2017) was a Nigerian academic, activist, and pan-Africanist. His admiration for founding Guinean president, Ahmed Sékou Touré, led to his adoption of the name "Toure". He was a history lecturer and researcher at Ahmadu Bello University (ABU), Zaria, Nigeria, with a number of publications in his name.

== Early life ==
Kazah-Toure, born in 1959 in Atyapland, Northern Region, British Nigeria (now part of southern Kaduna State, Nigeria), was the son of Kazah Yashim, the second Atyap formally-trained teacher (Note: See telegram from Sp-1143 (Schools) Zaria to Resident of Zaria at Zonkwa dated May 21, 1946, in "Zango Katab District Unrest 1946".) and first person from Southern Zaria (now Southern Kaduna) to be appointed at the District Council (of the defunct Northern Region) in 1954. He came from a mixed Christian and Muslim family, with his dad being a Christian and a few other family members being Muslims, 12 of whom were killed in the 1992 Zangon Kataf crises, the aftermath of which he, himself, became a Muslim.

== Working career ==
He lectured with the History department of the Ahmadu Bello University (ABU), Zaria, Kaduna State, Nigeria. He

" ...produced the best documentation of the nationalist struggle in Zangon Kataf even as he noted the many contradictions he embodied."

— Dr. Zuwaqhu Bonat

== Activism ==
Toure regarded the ideas of Nationalism and Christianity as the sell out of the Nigerian elite to imperialism, as he moved to Pan-Africanism from Nationalism, and got immersed in the epistemic community called the Council for the Development of Social Science Research in Africa (CODESRIA). He, from early times was involved in organising people in his native area to support the radical ferments and gained the nickname "PRP", and did thought strategically and planned for the platform managing the Students' Union of Ahmadu Bello University, Zaria, the Movement for Progressive Nigeria (MPN), while still a student there.

== Academic publications ==
Sole author

He authored the following:

- "Inter-Ethnic Relations, Conflicts and Nationalism in Zango Katab Area of Northern Nigeria: Historical Origins and Contemporary Forms" (1995) (A paper presented at the 8th CODESRIA General Assembly, Dakar, Senegal.)
- "The Political Economy of Ethnic Conflicts and Governance in Southern Kaduna, Nigeria: [De]Constructing a Contested Terrain" (1999)
- "Ethno-religious Conflicts in Kaduna State" (2003)
- "A Discourse on the Citizenship Question in Nigeria" (2005)
- "Transcending Myths and Mystifications: Challenge of Ethnic and Religious Conflicts in Northern Nigeria in the 21st Century" (A paper presented at the 21st CODESRIA General Assembly, 5-9 December, 2011, Rabat, Morocco.)

Co-author

He was also a co-author in the following works:

- "Ethno-religious Conflicts in Northern Nigeria" (co-authored with Professor Jibrin Ibrahim)
- Inclusive citizenship and democratic governance in Nigeria in "The geographies of citizenship in Nigeria" (2003)
- "Beyond State Failure and Collapse: Making the State Relevant in Africa" (2007)
- Identity Conflicts: Belonging and Exclusion in Zangon Katab in "Citizenship and Indigeneity Conflicts in Nigeria" (2012).
- The Imposition of British Colonialism on Atyapland, 1902-1928; and The Atyap Anti-Colonial Movement, 1929-1960 in "A Short History of the Atyap" (2019).
- "newsfrom the Nordic Africa Institute" (2020)

== Conferences ==
He was mentioned in conferences such as:

- African State-Formation and Bureaucracy in Comparative Perspective conference: Held between 16 – 18 September 2013 at the University of the Witwatersrand, Johannesburg

== Death ==
He died of a long ailment at 1:30 PM on 1 July 2017, at the age of 58.
