= Ayuba Gora Wobin =

Former Corps Secretary FRSC (Nigeria)

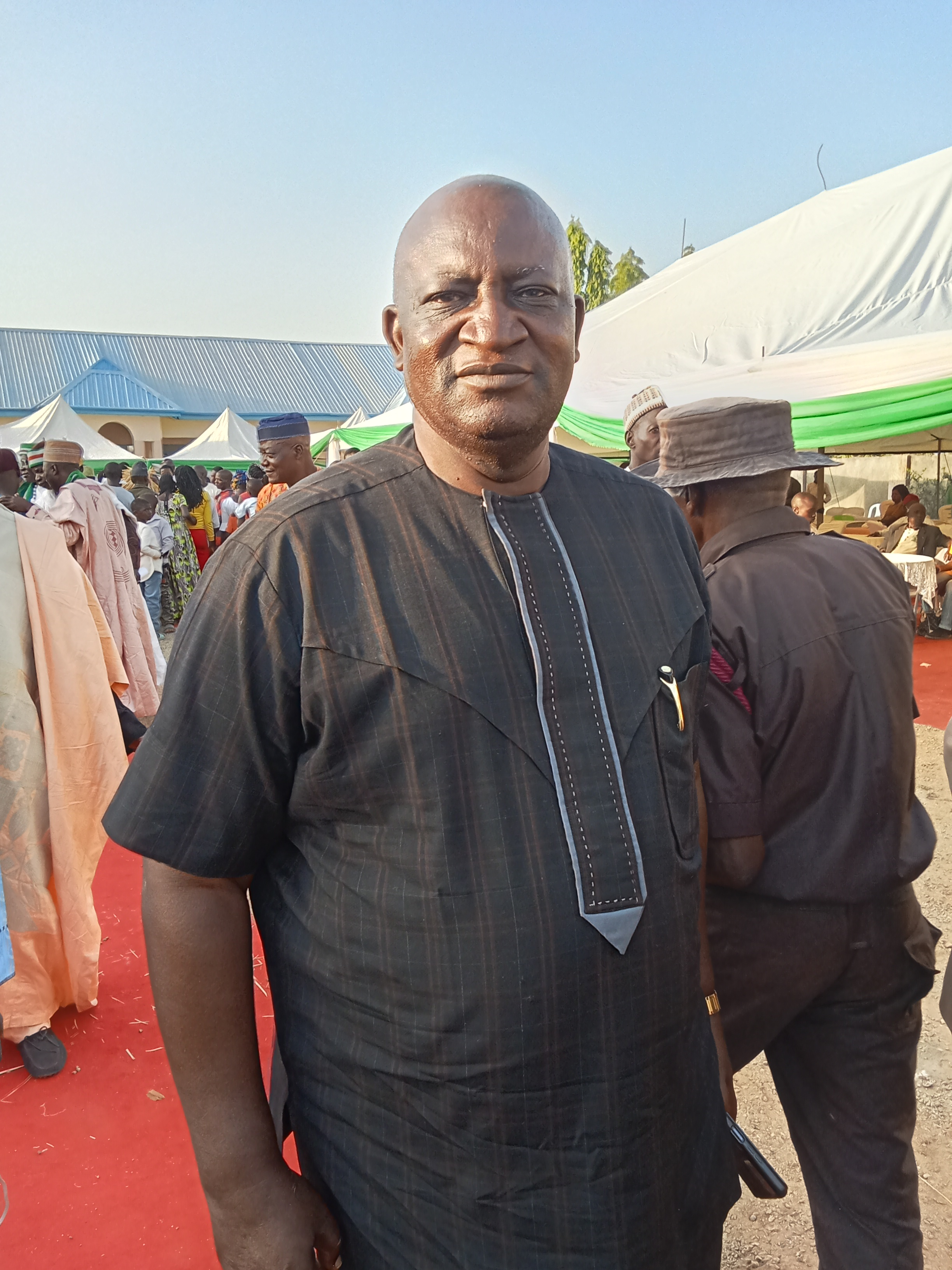
- ACM AG Wobin (rtd.) in 2023.

Assistant Corp Marshal Corps Secretary of Federal Road Safety Corps (FRSC)
- In office 2022 – June 19, 2023

Sector Commander, FRSC - FCT
- Succeeded by: Samuel Ogar Ochi

Personal details
- Born: Kanai, Kaduna State, Nigeria
- Party: Non-partisan

ACM Ayuba Gora Wobin was the Sector Commander of the Federal Road Safety Commission (FRSC) Federal Capital Territory Command, Abuja. He retired as the Assistant Corps Marshal Corps Secretary of the FRSC on 19 June 2023.

== Education and career ==
Wobin is an alumnus of the Government Secondary School, Kafanchan.

He began working as the Sector Commander Federal Road Safety Corps (FRSC), Federal Capital Territory Command in October 2017.

In 2019, he was misquoted as having said that it was a crime to use Google Maps as a driver, which was later debunked as being a false narrative during the 2019 Ember Months Campaign organized by the Lugbe Unit Command of the FRSC in Abuja, Nigeria's capital.

On 12 April 2021, he was promoted from the rank of a Corps Commander (CC) to that of an Assistant Corps Marshal (ACM) alongside nine others. By December of the same year, he was the Zonal Commanding Officer FRSC for Plateau, Nasarawa and Benue States, as an Assistant Corps Marshal.
