= Raquel Kasham Daniel =

Nigerian social entrepreneur

- Citizenship: Nigeria
- Education: University of Lagos
- Occupations: Social Entrepreneur; Educator; Author
- Organization(s): Beyond the Classroom Foundation, Bambini Africa
- Known for: Social Entrepreneurship, Education
- Notable work: She also co-founded Bambini Africa, creators of Bambini Books and Bambini TV; She founded Beyond the Classroom Foundation as a response to the social and educational needs of underprivileged children
- Awards: African Luther King Heroes Award; Women Achievers Award
- Website: raqueldaniel.com/rkd/

Raquel Kasham Daniel is a social entrepreneur, teacher, and author of several books including FLOW: a girl's guide to menstruation. She has received numerous awards for her work with educating marginalised children in Nigeria. She is also a recipient of the African Luther King Heroes Award. She founded Beyond the Classroom Foundation as a response to the social and educational needs of underprivileged children and created Nzuriaiki.com (now voluserve.com), an online platform that connects nonprofits with volunteers in Africa. She also co-founded Bambini Africa, creators of Bambini Books and Bambini TV.

== Early life ==
According to her account from interviews, Daniel is from Kaduna State and lived in Kaduna and Lagos most of her life. She is the first child in a family of four and the only girl. She lost her dad when she was sixteen and her mother four years later.

== Education ==
Daniel is an alumnus of University of Lagos.

== Bibliography ==
- My First Tracing Book (2021)
- FLOW: a girl's guide to menstruation
- Squeaky Clean
- My Big Fun Colouring Book
- My Big Fun Tracing Book
- The Alphabet Book on COVID-19
- My Personal Reading Log
- There is a New Virus in Town
- My Fun Colouring Book
