= Kagoma, Nigeria =

Kagoma Gwong
- District
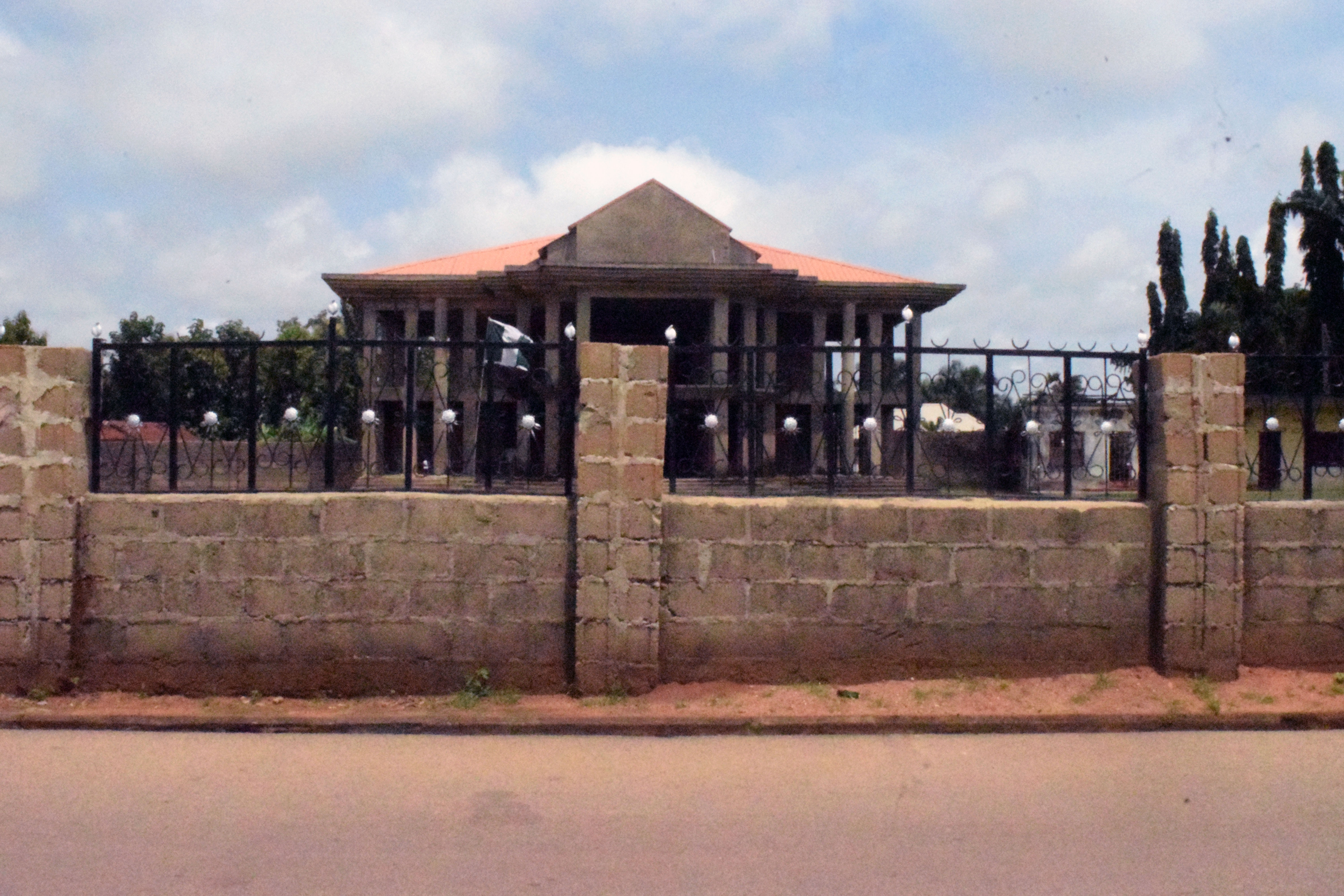
- Kpop Gwong's new palace under construction
- Nickname: K10
- Location within Nigeria
- Coordinates: 09°31′N 08°11′E
- Country: Nigeria
- State: Kaduna State
- LGA: Jema'a

Government
  - Kpop Gwong: Kpop (Col.) Paul Zakka Wyom (rtd.)
- Time zone: UTC+01:00 (WAT)
- Postal code: 801104
- Climate: Aw

Kagoma is a district of Jema'a Local Government Area, southern Kaduna state in the Middle Belt region of Nigeria. The postal code for the village is 801104.

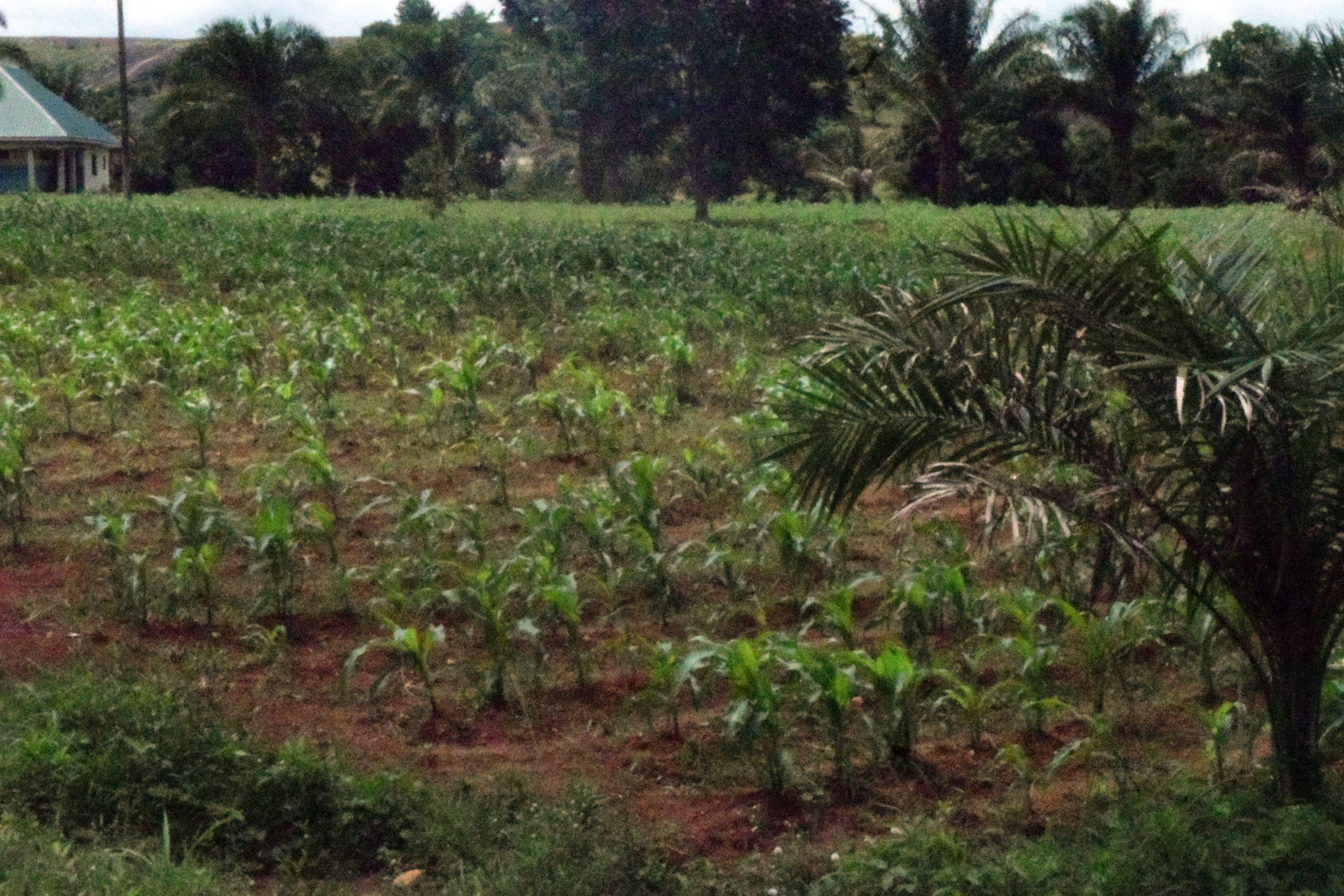
A corn field along Kagoma-Kwain (Kwoi) road

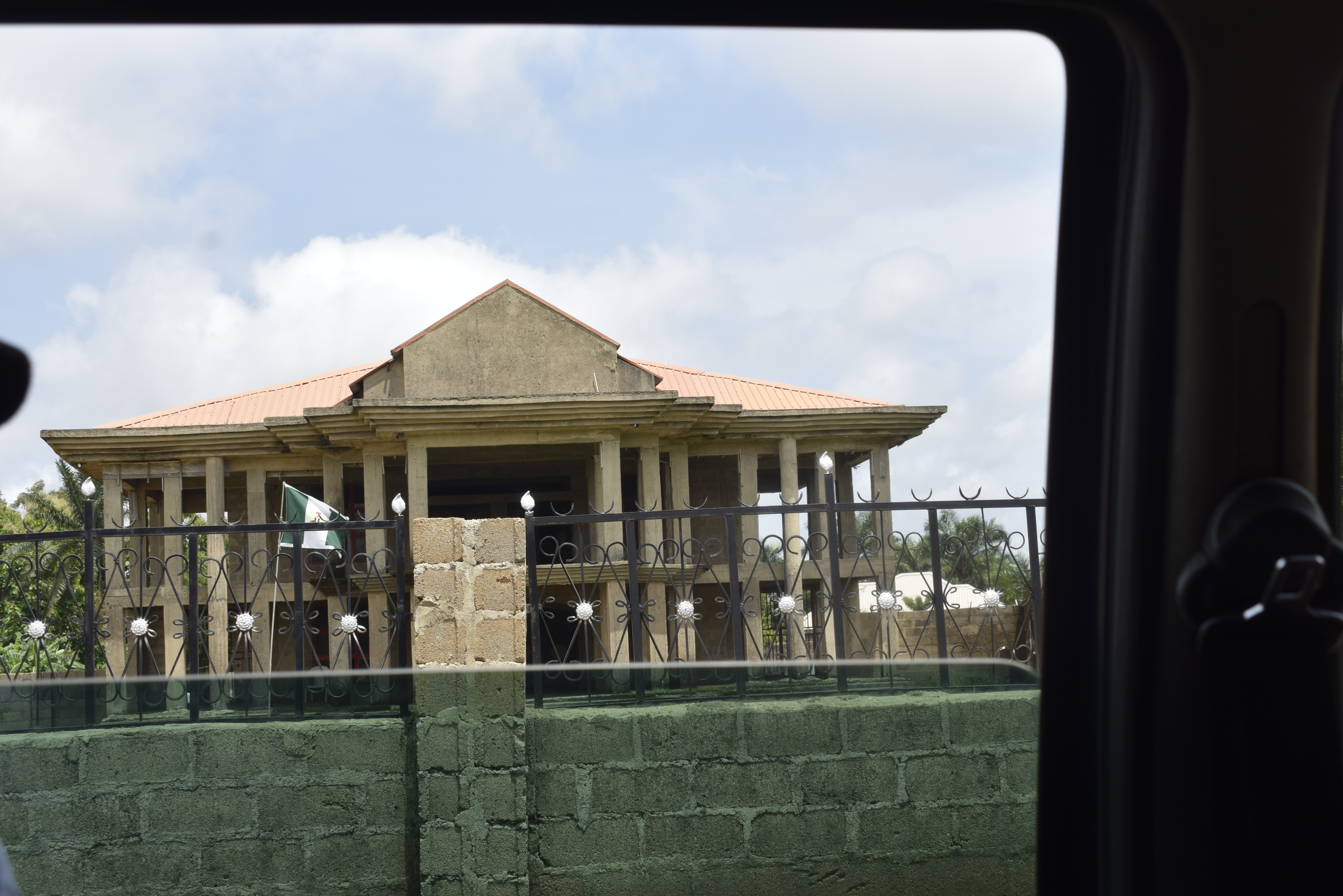
Kpop Gwong new palace site

== Transportation ==
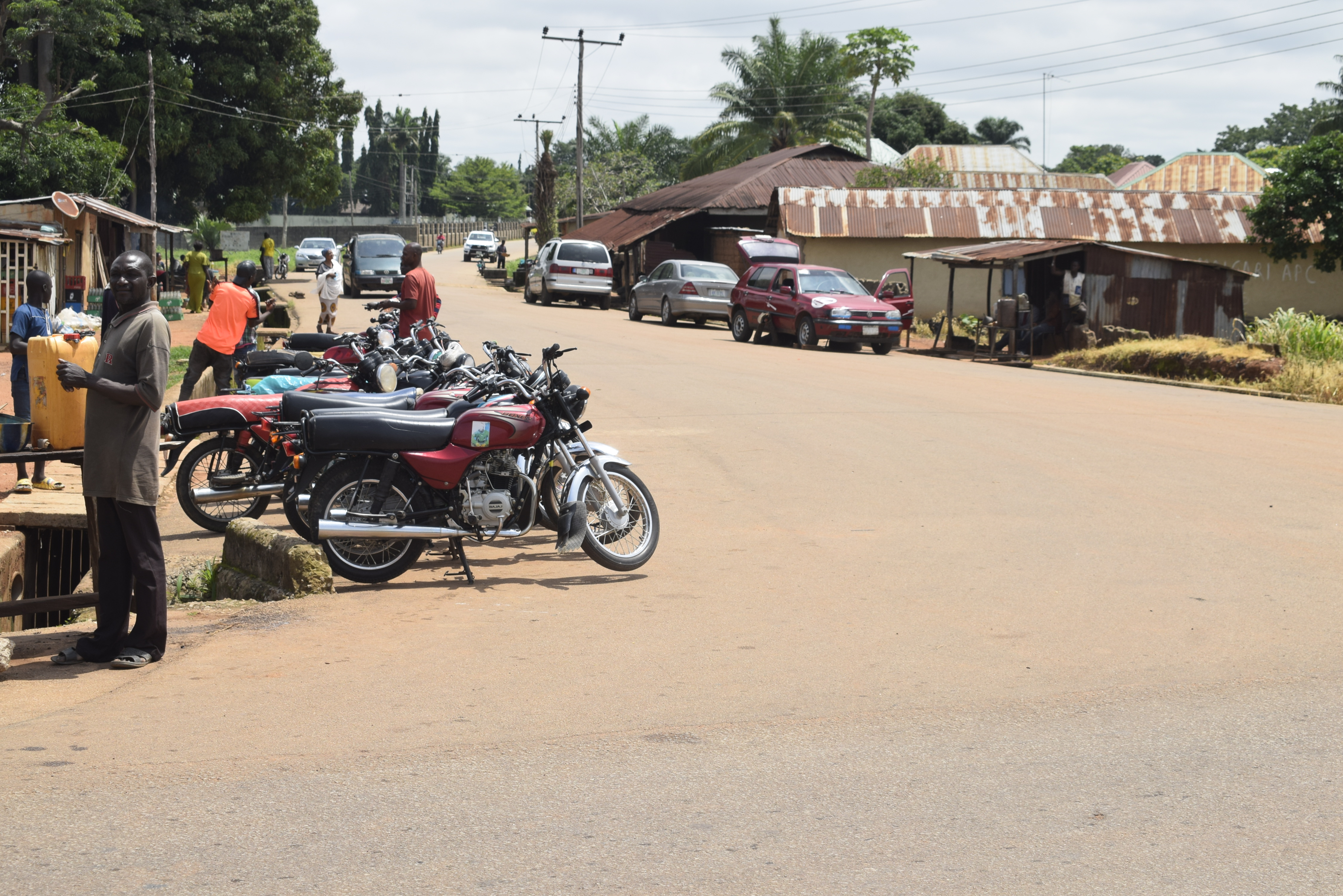
Junction to Kagoma town

The major means of transportation in and around the town is road transportation.

== History ==
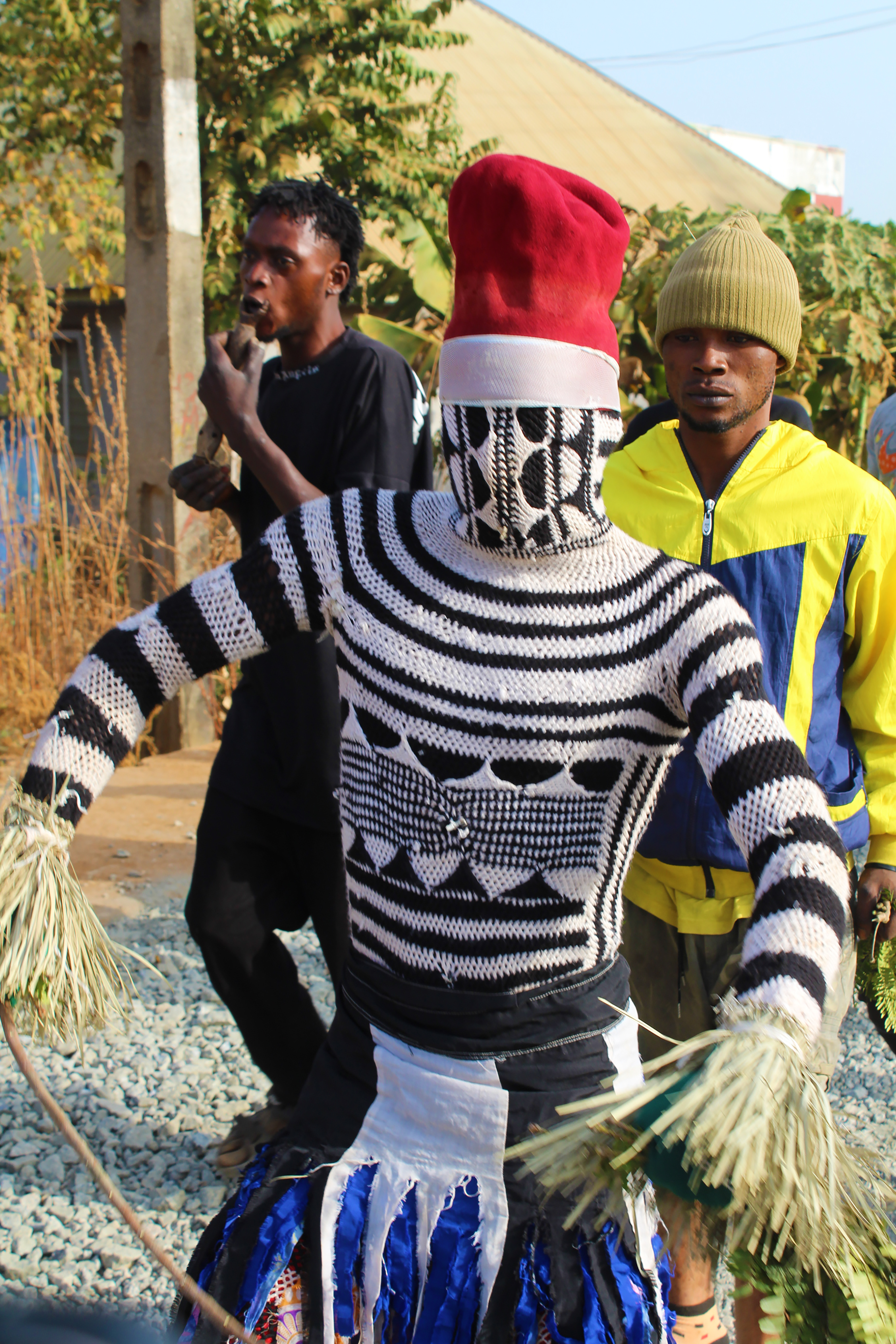
Kagoma Cultural display

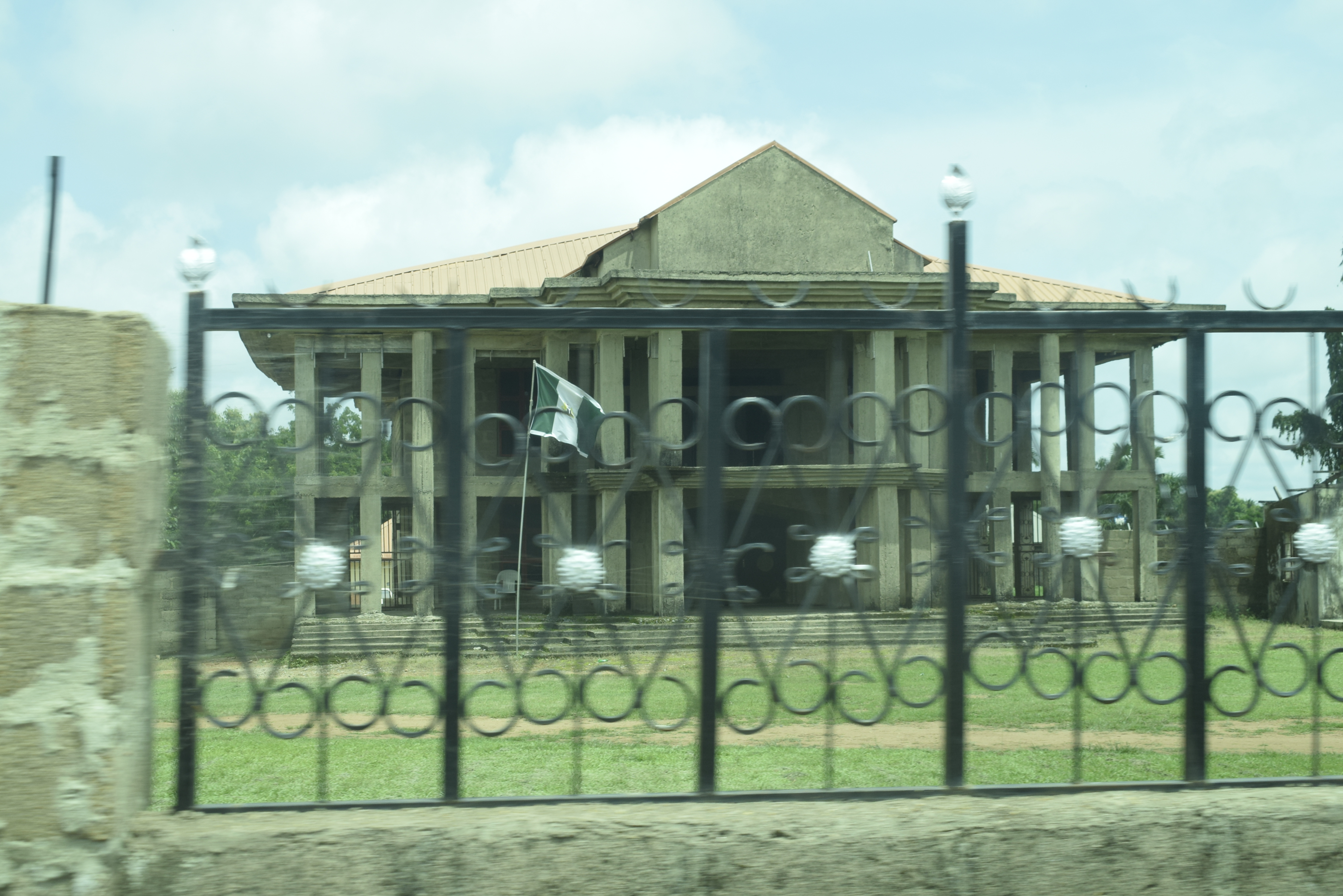
Kagoma palace

Kagoma is also known by people as Agoma,Gwong, and Kwong and this group is found in the Niger Congo family.It is because of the Hausa people that they are called Kagoma but normally they are known as Gwong.Gwong is in the Godogodo area of Jema’a LGA in kaduna state.Agriculture is their major source of live.
