= Comfort Amwe =

Nigerian politician

Comfort Amwe is a Nigerian female politician from Sanga Local Government Area of Kaduna state. She is representing Sanga constituency in the Kaduna state House of Assembly.

== Background ==
Amwe obtained an Ordinary National Diploma, (OND), from Plateau state polytechnic in 1983. She was one time adviser to the Kaduna state governor from September 2008 to September 2009.

=== Political career ===
Comfort Amwe was the chairperson of Sanga local government from May 2010 until she contested and won as member, Kaduna state house of assembly. She is a member of the Peoples Democratic Party, (PDP).
