= Paul Zakka Wyom =

Paramount ruler of Gwong Chiefdom, Nigeria

Kpop (Col.) Paul Zakka Wyom (rtd.)
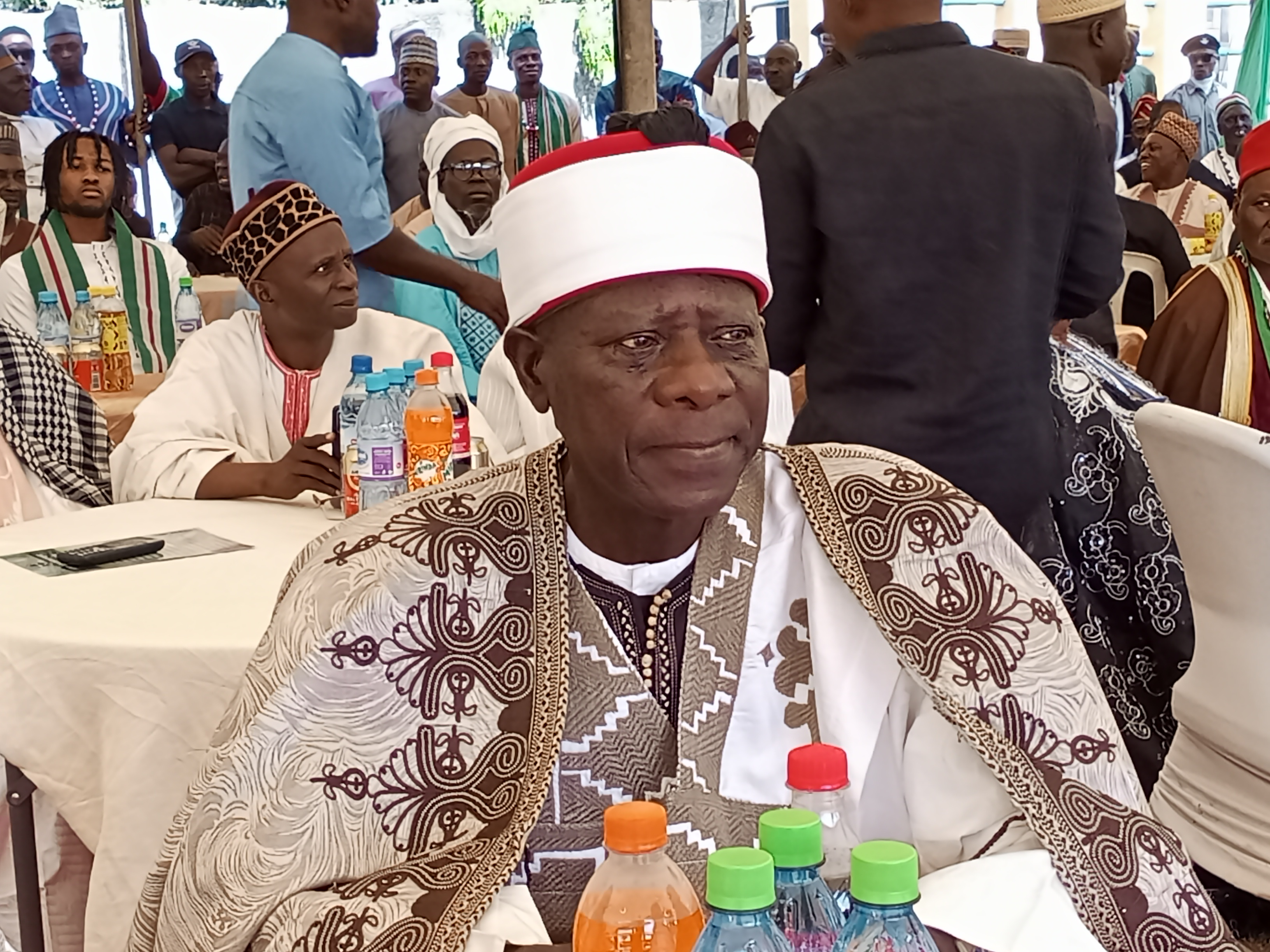
- HH PZ Wyom in December 2023

Paramount ruler of Gwong Chiefdom
- In office: 2000 – date
- Predecessor: Kpop Aruwa Jatau
Names
- English: Paul Zakka Wyom
- Religion: Protestantism

Paul Zakka Wyom, also Paul Zakka Wyoms is the paramount ruler of Gwong Chiefdom, a Nigerian traditional state in southern Kaduna State, Nigeria. He is also known by the title Kpop Gwong II. He was the spokesman on behalf of other monarchs at the burial preceding of a fellow Southern Kaduna monarch, murdered in early 2018. He is a first class monarch of the Gwong people.

Nigeria's Premium Times reported the monarch hosting the Kaduna State gubernatorial candidate for the All Progressives Congress in 2014.

Wyom as reported by a The Dream Daily reporter was said to have praised the growth in his chiefdom in January 2016. He later in March, hosted, as reported by Channels Television, the Khituk Gwong Day in Kagoma, Kaduna State, which was attended by the Nigerian Vice President, Yemi Osinbajo.

In January 2019, The Sun of Nigeria published on the monarch giving traditional title of "Byeh Gwong" (Helper of Gwong) to an 18-year-old Briton, Seth Thomas, who built a $50,000 primary health care centre at Asso, a community in the chiefdom inaugurated January 11, 2019.
