= Jere, Kaduna State =

Jere
- Town
- Location within Nigeria
- Coordinates: 09°34′08″N 07°26′06″E
- Country: Nigeria
- State: Kaduna State
- LGA: Kagarko
- Time zone: UTC+01:00 (WAT)
- Postal code: 802
- Climate: Aw

Jere is a town in Kagarko Local Government Area in southern Kaduna State in the North West region of Nigeria. The postal code of the area is 802.

== Population ==
Jere occupies an area of 0.933km² and has a population of 9,912 as at 2015.

== History ==
Jere is traditionally reliant on agriculture but increasingly defined by informal lead mining activities spurred by local unemployment and poverty.

The Jere community, encompassing areas like Jere South, has seen hundreds of artisanal miners—both locals and migrants—engaging in hazardous underground extraction, often digging up to 15 meters deep using rudimentary tools like picks and shovels, which exposes workers to risks including tunnel collapses and lead poisoning without regulatory oversight or safety measures.

== Insecurity ==
Jere has been considered an insecure location for Nigerians travelling along the Abuja-Kaduna expressway. In October 2016, the husband of former Nigerian Minister of Environment, Lawrencia Laraba Mallam, was kidnapped in Jere. There have been instances where kidnap victims paid large ransoms and were still killed.

In May 2024, a Leadership newspaper reporter covered an investigation by the Nigerian Safety Investigation Bureau (NSIB) into the cause of the derailment of passenger train KA2/Loco 2702, which was travelling from Rigasa train station in Kaduna to Idu train station in Abuja. The derailment occurred at Jere, but no injuries were reported. While rail infrastructure vandalism is a possible cause, it may not fully explain the derailment, according to an official of the Nigerian Railway Corporation (NRC).
