= Nigeria Fellowship of Evangelical Students =

Nigerian evangelical Christian student movement

Nigeria Fellowship of Evangelical Students (NIFES)
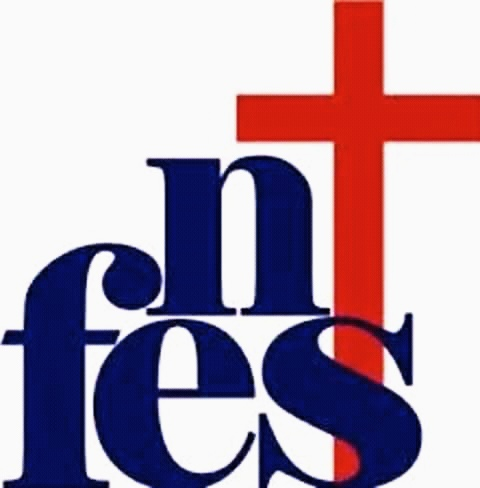
- Founded: 31 August 1968
- Type: Interdenominational Christian student movement
- Purpose: Campus Christian Evangelism and Discipleship
- Headquarters: Jos, Nigeria
- Origins: Bishop Smith Memorial College, Ilorin, Kwara State
- Region served: Nigeria
- Members: 2.2 million
- National Director/Council Secretary: Mr. Rex Nnaemeka Onuh
- National President: Akinwale Taiye Peter (2026)
- Revenue: ₦3.5 billion (2016)
- Volunteers: Over 1 million
- Website: nifes.org.ng
- Africa's largest campus movement

The Nigeria Fellowship of Evangelical Students (NIFES) is an evangelical Christian student movement with affiliate groups on university campuses in Nigeria. It is a member of the International Fellowship of Evangelical Students. The NIFES is the largest Christian Campus movement in Africa with secretariats in almost all Nigerian tertiary institutions.

== History ==
The formation of the NIFES saw the beginning of the evangelical students movement in Nigeria which started when some British graduates from the Inter-Varsity Fellowship of the UK initiated annual camps through which a number of African students’ leaders emerged and caught a vision for starting students groups, and there was a need to start an evangelical movement in Africa. The Pan-African Fellowship of Evangelical Students (PAFES) came into being with a vision to encourage national movements in all the countries involved with her in the African continent.

The first Nigerian PAFES conference was held at Ilesha from 31 August to 4 September 1967. Based on the challenge from the then Traveling Secretary, PAFES (W.A) Mr. Geotfried Osei Mensah on the formation of a Nigerian national movement, and a motion to that effect by Mr. (now Prof.) Kayode Adesogan a constitution drafting committee headed by Mr. (now Prof.) Ebong Mbipom as chairman and Mr. (now Rev. (Dr)) Kunle Obadina as secretary was constituted. At the end of the year, the committee produced its first version of the NIFES constitution and also planned the 1st National Conference. On 31 August 1968, members from eleven evangelical groups in post secondary institutions in Nigeria met at Bishop Smith Memorial College, Ilorin, Kwara State and decided to pass the draft constitution and to make themselves available to God’s service in extending His kingdom in Nigeria tertiary institutions through a National Movement known as Nigeria Fellowship of Evangelical Students. From that small beginning in 1968, NIFES has been able to mobilize over 80,000 students in about 300 Universities and Colleges all over Nigeria through Bible Studies, Prayer Meeting, Biblical Discipleship and Leadership Training.

Prior to the formation of NIFES, Christian students who had benefited from the Ministry of Scripture Union (S.U) and Fellowship Christian Students (F.C.S) in their secondary schools were getting involved with Christian lecturers who invited them for prayers, Bible studies and higher learning. From such interaction the need arose for more regular fellowship meetings and this went on till 1968 when at a Conference in Ilorin, Kwara State NIFES was formally inaugurated as a movement founded by the students themselves.

== Mission ==
NIFES is a national, non-denominational, evangelical Christian movement, primarily reaching out to students in tertiary institutions across Nigeria. A national movement evidenced by its presence in all the 36 states of the federation including the FCT. NIFES works in over 294 campuses with about 30,000 Christian students involved. NIFES is affiliated to the International Fellowship of Evangelical Students (IFES) with membership in 150 countries of the world. NIFES is by God’s Grace, the largest Christian Student Movement operating in Universities and colleges worldwide within the International Fellowship of Evangelical Students. NIFES, by its composition and functional scope, stands as a symbol of unity among Christian Students of various denominations and believers of different ethnic identities.
