= Gyong language =

Plateau language of Nigeria

Gyong
- Kagoma
- Gyong
- Native to: Nigeria
- Region: Kaduna State
- Ethnicity: Gwong
- Native speakers: (25,000 cited 2000)
- Language family: Niger–Congo?: Atlantic–Congo; Benue–Congo; Plateau; Central ?; Gyongic ?; Gyong

Language codes
- ISO 639-3: kdm
- Glottolog: kago1247

Gyong, also known as Kagoma, is a Plateau language of Nigeria. spoken by about 20,000 people in northwest Nigeria. The people call themselves Acipu and are called Acipawa in Hausa.<ref> It is spoken by the Gwong people, whose indigenous homeland is in Jema'a Local Government Area in the southern part of Kaduna State, Nigeria.
