= Yohanna Akaito =

Ere Yohanna Akaito (JP)

Monarch of Koro Chiefdom
- In office: 2001 – date
- House: Ashe/Ala
- Religion: Christianity

Yohanna Akaito is the first and current paramount ruler of the Koro Chiefdom, a Nigerian traditional state with headquarters in Uhucha, southern Kaduna State, Nigeria. He is also known by the title Ere-Koro 1.

== Kingship ==
About the time of the formation of the Koro Chiefdom by the Kaduna State government in December 2000, an election was held to select the first Ere-Koro, held among three contestants from the three ruling have including: Yohanna Akaito (JP) (Ashe/Ala ruling house), Abubakar G. Husaini (Miya-Miya ruling house) and Engr. Danbaba T. Tukura (Ache/Wachi ruling house), under the coordination of the secretary General of the Koro Community Development Association with assistance from Lawrence A. Gojeh and Andrew Makeri, with multiple witnesses. Akaito pulled the highest number of votes and was therefore elected Ere-Koro.

His 20 years reign was celebrated in January 2021.
