= Koro Wachi language =

Plateau dialect cluster of Nigeria

Koro Wachi
- Tinɔr
- Native to: Nigeria
- Region: Kaduna State
- Native speakers: 150,000 (2006–2012)
- Language family: Niger–Congo?: Atlantic–Congo; Benue–Congo; Plateau; Central ?; Koroic; Koro Wachi

Language codes
- ISO 639-3: Either: ahs – Ashe bqv – Begbere-Ejar
- Glottolog: ashe1269 Ashe begb1241 Begbere-Ejar

Tinɔr
- Person: uTinɔr
- People: baTinɔr

Ìzɛ̀
- Person: únɛ́r ìzɛ̀
- People: Bɛ̀zɛ̀

Koro Wachi (also Waci), natively Tinɔr and Myamya, is a dialect cluster of Plateau languages spoken to the north of Keffi in Nasarawa State, Kagarko Local Government Area and Jema'a Local Government of southern Kaduna State in central Nigeria. Koro Wachi forms part of a larger cultural grouping with the Ashe.

== Varieties ==
The Ashe share a common ethnonym with the Tinɔr-Myamya which is Uzar for 'person' (pl. Bazar for the people, and Ìzar for the language). This name is the origin of the term Ejar.

Tinɔr and Myamya constitute a language pair in the cluster. The Tinɔr-Myamya peoples actually have no common name for themselves, but refer to individual villages when speaking, and apply noun-class prefixes to the stem.

== Distribution ==
Tinor is spoken in seven villages south and west of Kubacha: Uca, Unɛr, Ùsám, Marke, Pànkòrè, Ùtúr, and Gɛshɛberẽ.

Myamya is spoken in three villages north and west of Kubacha. Ùshɛ̀, Bàgàr (includes Kúràtǎm, Ùcɛr and Bɔ̀dṹ), and Bàgbwee.
