= Aminu Kano =

Nigerian politician (1920–1983)

Mallam Aminu Kano GCON
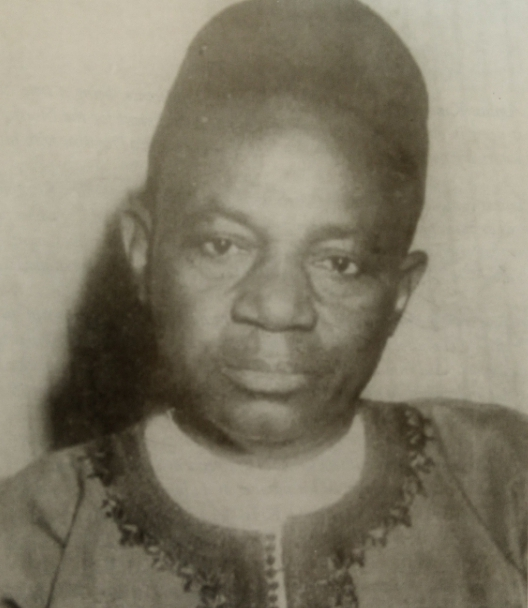

President-General of People's Redemption Party
- In office 1978–1983
- Preceded by: position established
- Succeeded by: Khalifa Hassan Yusuf

Federal Commissioner for Health
- In office 13 January 1972 – 1974
- Preceded by: Josiah Okezie
- Succeeded by: Emmanuel O. Abisoye

Federal Commissioner for Communications
- In office 12 June 1967 – 13 January 1971
- Preceded by: Raymond Njoku
- Succeeded by: Joseph Tarka

Deputy Government Chief Whip
- In office December 1959 – 30 December 1964
- Chief Whip: Bello Dandago
- Preceded by: position established

Member of Parliament for Kano East
- In office December 1959 – 30 December 1964
- Preceded by: Maitama Sule
- Succeeded by: Mahmud Dantata

President-General of Northern Elements Progressive Union
- In office 1953–1966
- Preceded by: Abba Maikwaru
- Succeeded by: position abolished

Personal details
- Born: Mohammed Aminu Yusufu; 9 August 1920 Sudawa, Kano (now in Gwale, Kano State)
- Died: 17 April 1983 (aged 62) Kano
- Resting place: Mambayya House; 12°0′54.342″N 8°30′20.4912″E
- Party: People's Redemption Party
- Other political affiliations: Northern Elements Progressive Union; Northern People's Congress; Northern Progressive Front
- Spouses: Umma (m. 1939–1940) Hasia (m. 1942, divorced): Shatu; Zahra (m. 1967; div. 1970) Asma'u (m. 1970)
- Relations: Gyanawa (clan)
- Education: Kaduna College; University of London
- Occupation: Teacher, politician, poet, writer, trade unionist

Mallam Aminu Kano GCON (9 August 1920 — 17 April 1983) was a Nigerian politician, teacher, poet, playwright, and trade unionist from Kano. One of the most prominent figures in Nigeria's independence movement and post-independence political history, he was known for his opposition to colonialism, the dominance of traditional rulers, and the social inequalities in Northern Nigeria. He was a founding figure of the Northern Elements Progressive Union (NEPU) and later led the People's Redemption Party (PRP), both of which were socialist parties which advocated for the emancipation of the talakawa (commoners) in Nigeria.

Aminu began his career as a teacher and emerged as an early critic of the British colonial government, and publicly challenged the native aristocracy, denouncing the colonial system of indirect rule as oppressive and exploitative of the talakawa. In 1948, he founded the Northern Teachers' Association, the first labour union in Northern Nigeria, and became a founding member of the Northern People's Congress (NPC), which he later left due to its conservatism. As leader of NEPU from 1953, he championed democratic socialism, women's rights, and the empowerment of the talakawa, seeking to align Islamic principles with social justice.

He served in the Federal House of Representatives from 1959 and held ministerial appointments during Nigeria's military era, including as a Federal Commissioner under Yakubu Gowon's administration. As a parliamentarian and United Nations delegate, Aminu Kano supported liberation movements in Africa and promoted a non-aligned foreign policy. He later returned to party politics in the Second Republic as the presidential candidate of the PRP.

Widely regarded as a visionary reformer, Aminu Kano left a lasting legacy in Nigerian political thought. Institutions named in his honour include the Mallam Aminu Kano International Airport, Aminu Kano Teaching Hospital, and several colleges and research centres. He is considered one of the founding fathers of modern Nigeria and remains a symbol of social justice and grassroots activism.

== Early life and education ==
Aminu Kano was born in the Sudawa ward of Kano on 9 August 1920 to Rakaiya and Mallam Yusufu of the Gyanawa, a Fulani clan known for their expertise in Islamic jurispudence. Of his mother's six births, he was the only one to reach the age of 15. Both of his parents were well learned in Islam, and his father later served as Chief Alkali of Kano. His grandmother was given the Fulani title of Modibbo, typically reserved for respected Islamic scholars. According to local tradition, Usman dan Fodio, the founder of the Sokoto Caliphate, himself appointed a relative of Aminu to the position of Kano's chief Alkali. Since then, the Gyanawa have been sought after to occupy legal positions such as alkalis, walis and muftis.

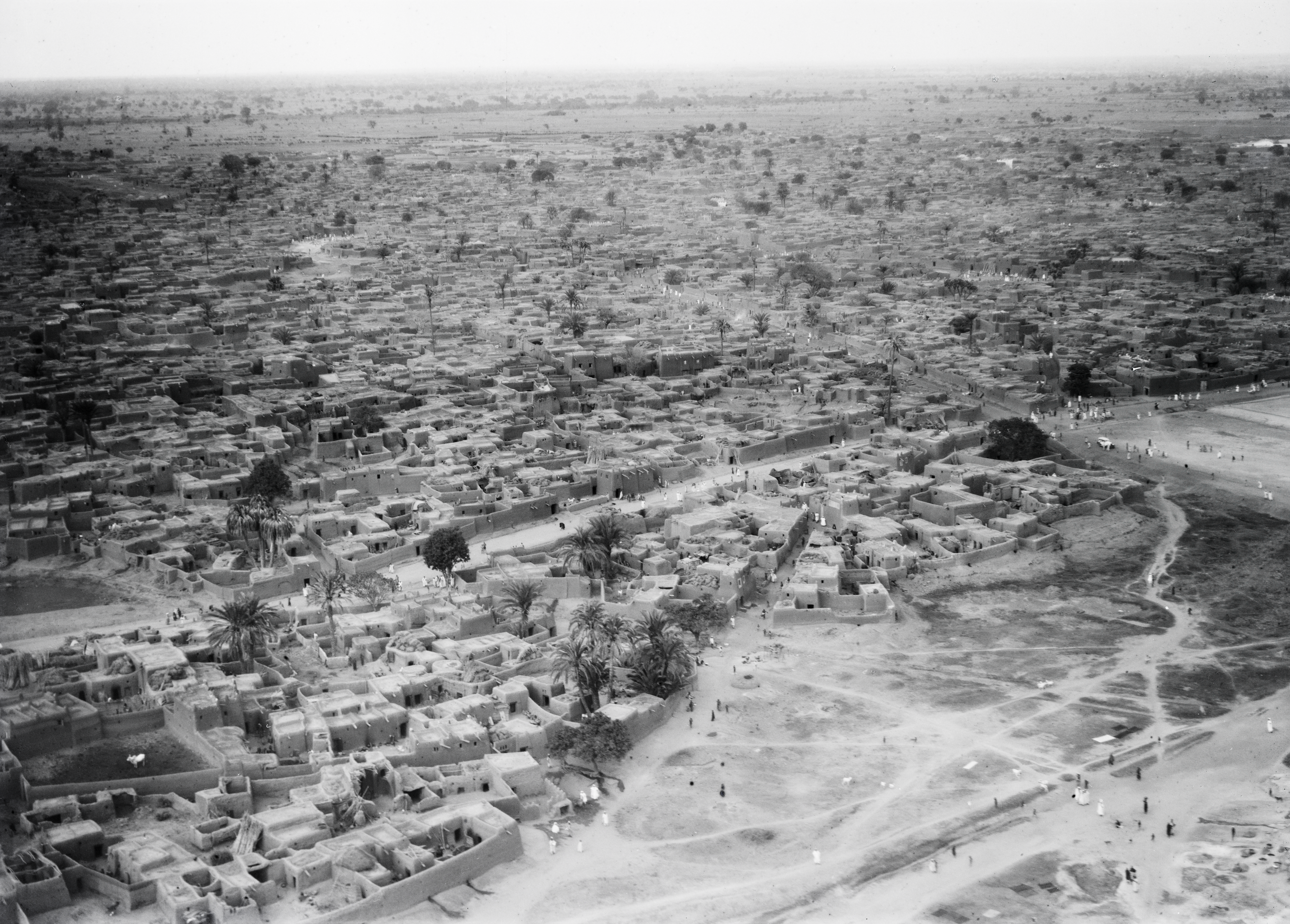
Aerial view of Kano in the early 1930s.

Aminu's maternal lineage also had several learned men and women dating back centuries. They were Fulbe who emigrated from Kukawa in the Bornu empire to Kano. Among them was a mallam who served as a personal adviser to the then Emir of Kano, Sulimanu. This mallam supported himself by breeding and selling pigeons, earning the nickname Mallam Mai Tattabari ('the mallam who raises pigeons'). This nickname became an official title in the Kano palace and has been passed down to his successors, serving as the emirs' personal Imams and advisers on Islamic law.

As an infant, Aminu began his education with his first teachers being his mother and grandmother, who both taught him the Arabic language and how to read the Quran. After his mother died in 1926, he relocated to his uncle's home to live under the care of his maternal grandmother, who lived there. Consequently, Halilu, his uncle who was later appointed 'Mallam Mai Tattabari', became responsible for his Koranic education. Aminu was further enrolled into Shehuci Primary School, a western school, where he was taught how to read and write in English. He adopted the name of his birthplace, Kano, as his surname, a common practice among western educated Northern Nigerians at the time.

In 1933, Aminu began attending Kano Middle School (later renamed Rumfa College, Kano), a boarding school. There, in 1935, he led one of the first student strikes in Nigeria against a shortage of soap, poor food, "too many restrictions, and too severe a code of behavior". He then proceeded to Kaduna College (later renamed Barewa College) where he obtained a diploma in education in 1942.

== Teaching career ==
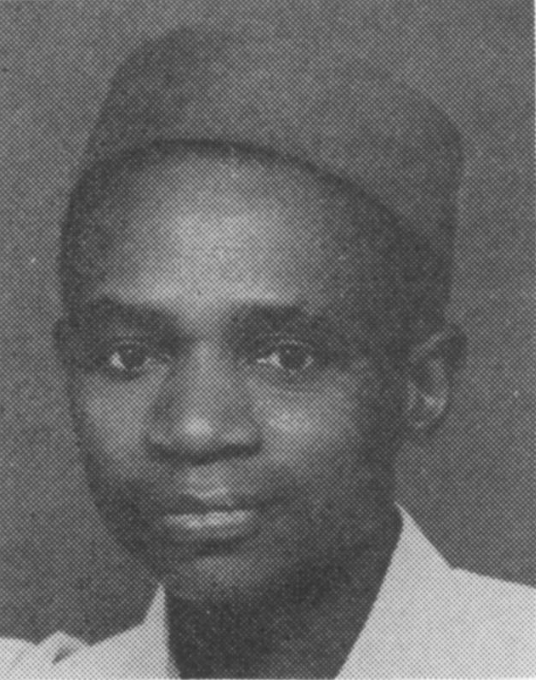
A young Aminu Kano

After graduating from Kaduna College in 1940, Aminu opted for a career in law rather than following the path of his classmates who mostly chose teaching. This choice was uncommon as Sharia courts, more popular than the parallel magistrate courts in Kano among Muslims, did not allow lawyers. Additionally, his interest in studying medicine in England was hindered by the requirement to attend King's College and Yaba Higher College, both in Lagos in Southern Nigeria, for some years. However, due to ongoing student unrests, the principal of King's College was reluctant to admit Aminu, who was known for leading student protests. Aminu also attempted to join the army and the police force but was rejected from both as he was five feet four, an inch shorter than the minimum height requirement. At Kaduna College, many continued to advise him to pursue a teaching career but it was his science teacher, Dr. R. E. Miller, who convinced him to take up teaching as a profession. Miller's argument was

Look, I'd advise you to join the teaching class. With the war going on, and the Germans advancing on all fronts, it isn't inconceivable that Hitler may temporarily take over Nigeria. In such a case, you would need a professional hiding place, and what better place than teaching? Besides, I would take you as the sole teacher-in-training for science—one of your great loves, right?

During his teacher training, Aminu was assigned to various towns for teaching assignments. In his second year, he spent five months each in Bauchi and Zaria and an additional two months "visiting schools in the south". It was in his final year of training in 1942 that his burgeoning radical political views became apparent. He began writing for the few newspapers and magazines available at the time, like Gaskiya Ta Fi Kwabo and the West African Pilot, and developed a keen interest in politics. It was also during this year that he penned his pamphlet 'Kano Under the Hammer of Native Autocracy,' a critique of the Native Authority.

Towards the end of his time at Kaduna College, he met Sa'adu Zungur, who was to "influence Aminu's thinking profoundly". Zungur, older than Aminu and an earlier proponent of radical politics, served as the head of the School of Pharmacy in Zaria. Aminu often had long discussions with Zungur, frequently visiting his home after classes. Their acquaintance dated back to 1935 when Zungur visited Kano, leaving a lasting impression on Aminu with his radical and progressive views. Aminu maintained sporadic correspondence with Zungur until their reunion in Zaria.

=== Bauchi ===
Upon completing his teacher training, Aminu relocated to Bauchi, assuming the role of a junior teacher at Bauchi Middle School. His colleagues at the school included Abubakar Tafawa Balewa and Yahaya Gusau. Aminu's amicable relationship with Balewa, who later became Nigeria's only ever Prime Minister, began during their time teaching in Bauchi. It was during this period that Balewa gave him the nickname 'Molotov' after Vyacheslav Molotov, the Soviet statesman. Zungur also moved to Bauchi during this time, having returned to his hometown due to a lung disorder he got in Zaria.

Aminu was well-respected among the students at the school. They often gathered at his home after school hours for discussions and other extra-curricular activities. He occasionally organised plays and shows for the students, sometimes using Abubakar Imam's works. To supplement his lessons, he composed songs and poems for his students. He was also active in various student societies including drama, debating, and science.

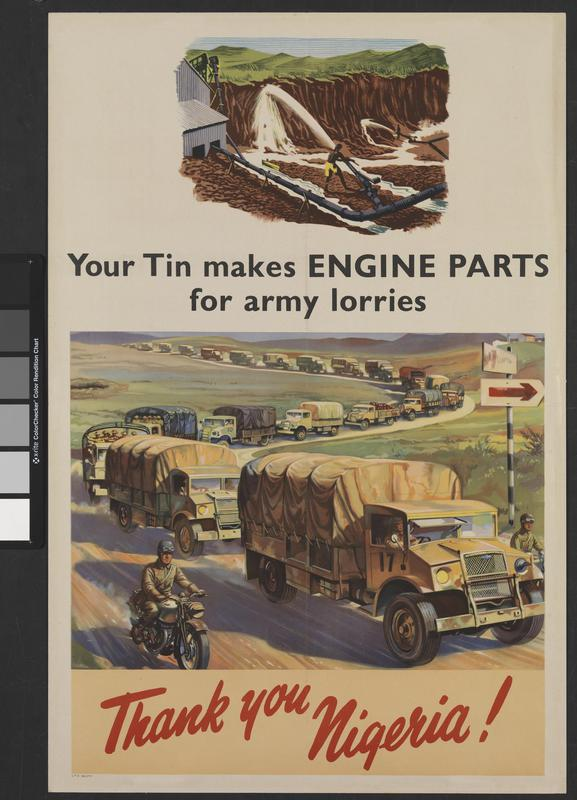
A 1940s propaganda poster made by Britain to encourage Nigerian 'volunteers' to aid its war effort

His close association with the students and his radical ideas made him unpopular with the school's administration and other teachers. On one occasion, the entire student body staged a strike over issues such as lack of uniforms and blankets, withheld pocket money, and poor food quality. The one student left, the head boy who was Balewa's younger brother, acted as their spokesman. The senior students, among them was Sule Katagum, lead the other students towards Maiduguri. The Emir of Bauchi and several teachers caught up with them, attempting to negotiate, but the students insisted on speaking only with Aminu. Later, Aminu arrived with Yahya Gusau, and "reassured them that their complaints would get proper airing" and convinced them to return to their dormitories. Following an investigation into the complaints, they were validated, resulting in the replacement of the headmaster with Balewa, "who righted the pre-existing wrongs".

==== Bauchi General Improvement Union ====
In 1943, Aminu, alongside Zungur, Balewa and Gusau, formed the Bauchi General Improvement Union (BGIU), where they held discussions critiquing British colonial policies and the Native Authority. This organisation was likely influenced by a similar organisation Zungur had founded while in Zaria, the Northern Provinces General Improvement Union (NPGIU). Aminu and Zungur wrote letters and articles attacking the British 'directed labour' policy, which they saw as a disguised form of conscription. With Britain requiring significant quantities of food, tin, and soldiers for World War II, colonial officials exerted pressure on Native Authorities to 'direct' specified quotas of food and manpower. Britain extensively used unregulated forced conscription in Northern Nigeria to support its war effort after its military misfortunes in the Far East in 1942. One of Aminu's unsigned articles was read by the senior District Officer, A J Knott, in the West African Pilot, who traced it back to the BGIU. This discovery led to the dissolution of the union and its replacement with the Bauchi Discussion Circle (BDC) or Majalisar Tadi ta Bauchi, sponsored by colonial authorities. The BDC was designed as a sanctioned platform for open debate encompassing 'any and all ideas'.

==== Bauchi Discussion Circle ====
BDC held weekly discussions, attracting various attendees like department heads, administrators, merchants and teachers. The number of participants surpassed that of the previous Bauchi General Improvement Union (BGIU), attracting moderates who felt more at ease given the government's sanction. Aminu, as secretary, was in charge of sending out invitations and choosing the topics to be discussed. These topics discussed included economic development, democracy, medicine, war and religion. When the topic was freedom of the press, Aminu and Zungur highlighted the contradiction in British policy, arguing that on the one hand they suppressed and privately condemned the only voices independent of the emirs and on the other hand, they publicly encouraged independent thought and initiative.

In a discussion on indirect rule, he argued that "it had outlived the purpose for which it was originally intended" and that it was "the most exploiting system of colonial administration the world had ever known". He further pointed out that at the time of the British takeover, the Sokoto Caliphate and its emirates had morphed into a system unintended by Shehu Usman dan Fodio, its founder. Aminu argued that the succession of caliphs was meant to be based on merit rather than birth and that the autocratic system of governance was against the teachings of the Islamic Prophet Muhammad and the Shehu. Balewa, being more of a moderate than Aminu, lightly defended the indirect rule system, arguing that the maintenance of law and order was essential in securing the foundation on which desired reforms could be carried out. Zungur, bedridden during the session, in response to Balewa, wrote his own arguments in a letter which was delivered to the discussion circle by Aminu during the following session. In this letter, he bolstered Aminu's arguments while adding a few of his own. He urged Balewa to reconsider his "ill-conceived" defence of indirect rule and further argued:

The selection of its [the Native Authority's] gutter elite is being made neither on the basis of intelligence nor capacity, but simply by denial of the decent citizen's outlook. Members of the ruling minority have the readiness of desperadoes to gamble, with nothing to lose but everything to gain.

During another meeting, Aminu posed a question to Officer Knott: 'What determines an emir's salary?' Knott responded that it depended on the extent of his duties and the weight of his responsibilities. Aminu then pointed out that despite having fewer constituents and responsibilities compared to the Emir of Bauchi, the Lamido of Adamawa received a higher salary. Following this exchange, the meeting abruptly ended. Soon after, Knott announced the termination of the BDC, citing that the discussions were 'getting off the rails'.

==== Bauchi Community Center ====
To replace the BDC, Aminu and Zungur established another political organisation, the Bauchi Community Center. Starting with about 20 members, their first meeting took place at the Native Authority Library, near the emir's palace. During this meeting, accompanied by a policeman, Balewa approached them at the emir's request, asking them to disband as "all unions (organizations) are forbidden". Zungur then told him to tell the emir that they were not going to disband. After Balewa left, they decided to deliver a letter to the senior political officer telling him what had happened, claiming the emir was trespassing on their rights.

Three days later, the organization's members were invited to meet with the emir. The emir denied ordering their disbandment, and claimed that he had only forbade them from using "the Native Authority Library typewriters and facilities". Despite Balewa complaining that he delivered the message given to him accurately and Zungur ready to exploit this contradiction, the matter wasn't pursued further, and the organization accepted the emir's decision. Shortly after, an elderly man named Mallam Waziri offered them the use of his roofless hall for meetings, provided they roofed it themselves. They pooled their money together and roofed it. Not long after, the British government offered Aminu one of seven scholarships to study in England starting from September 1946, which he accepted.

=== London ===
At the Institute of Education in London, Aminu delved into the works of figures like Harold Laski, George Bernard Shaw, and Karl Mannheim, whose teachings is "the source of many of Aminu's ideas on the ideal human society". He established relations with several left-wing figures and organisations in London, including the Socialist Labour Party, the Student Socialist Society, and the Young Socialists, and met and befriended some left-leaning Members of Parliament and "top leaders" of communist organisations. He was also influenced by leading Labour politicians of the time, such as Aneurin Bevan and Fenner Brockway.

After being exposed to these ideas and influences, Aminu attempted to blend the political philosophies of early French and American revolutionaries with Shavian Fabian socialism and the teachings of Usman dan Fodio, all while still under the influence of Sa'adu Zungur's radical ideas. He also witnessed the eve of India and Pakistan's independence struggles through the students from both nations. Aminu, alongside students from various British colonies, welcomed Ali Jinnah and Jawaharlal Nehru, leading figures in the independence movements of Pakistan and India respectively, during their London visit in 1947. These experiences likely contributed to his interest in the Gandhian form of resistance.

During his course, Aminu taught in local primary schools and spent weeks in the Welsh countryside as a guest of the Young Farmers' Club. To fund his planned tour of the British countryside, he took on a part-time Hausa language translator role with the British Broadcasting Company (BBC). Unexpectedly, he was invited as a delegate to the World Boy Scout Jamboree in Rosny, allowing him to tour Europe at a discounted rate. Just before his journey to France, the entire boy scout contingent visited Buckingham Palace. Aminu was shocked the see the king and queen chatting and mingling freely with the boys which was a stark contrast with the way the British officialdom behaved back in Nigeria. This contradiction left him optimistic, interpreting it as a sign of the colonial empire's impending collapse.

==== Northern Teachers' Association ====
In March 1948, while still studying London, Aminu formed the Northern Teachers' Welfare Association (later Northern Teachers' Association), the first region-wide organisation and labour union in Northern Nigeria, alongside other teachers from the region, like Salihu Fulani, Z. Y. Dimka, Yahaya Gusau, Shettima Shehu Ajiram, Shehu Shagari, and Abubakar Tafawa Balewa. The union focused on issues like rights and welfare of teachers, an improved syllabus, differences in salary between the North and the South and the eligibility of teachers in Christian Mission Schools for membership.

The union grew rapidly, having about 200 members in its first month and 25 branches within its first year and was later influential on the region's nationalist organisations that came after it. The union continued being the most dominant teachers' union in Northern Nigeria until is merger with the Nigerian Union of Teachers, the dominant teachers' union in southern Nigeria, in 1972.

=== Return to Bauchi ===
With the end of his course in 1948, Aminu returned to Bauchi to resume his teaching career at the Bauchi Middle School. A few months later he was transferred to the Bauchi Teachers' Training College.

During this time, Sir John MacPherson, the newly appointed Governor of Nigeria, was gearing up for a tour across the region. He was to tour the major cities of the North, but excluded Bauchi. Aminu and Zungur suspected that this omission was a deliberate move by the Governor and his advisors to avoid confronting the city's outspoken radicals and their list of demands and grievances. The two approached the Emir of Bauchi and informed him of the government's plan to avoid his domain, claiming it was because of Bauchi's poor school system, roads, and economy. They managed to convince him to permit them to organise a mass rally to protest the Governor's omission. This mass rally, which was the first ever held in Northern Nigeria, amassed about a thousand people.

Aminu, at the time still a junior teacher, was invited to Kaduna to meet with A J Knott (the district officer who had organised the BDC in 1943), now the Chief Secretary to the Government, and Sir MacPherson. During this meeting, the governor, addressing Aminu, had reportedly said:

You have indicated that you think we intentionally keep the North backward, and the North and South divided—that you want us to go so that your country may have independence. You're a man from an important Kano family, young and full of spirit, but you must realize that we don't intentionally prevent changes and keep the country from progressing.

Knott proceeded to inform Aminu that they had been paying attention to his critiques of the government, stating, "We really like men like you, who are ahead of your countrymen". They offered him a position which would allow him to monitor and participate in the "financial section of the government" or even as the next editor of Gaskiya Ta Fi Kwabo. After returning to Bauchi, Aminu, after considering these offers and discussing them with Zungur and others, concluded that these offers were an attempt by the government to disrupt their activist activities. Consequently, Aminu rejected the offers, informing Knott and MacPherson that he preferred to remain a teacher. He also later turned down a job as a lecturer in Hausa at the Oxford University.

However, some months later, in their ongoing efforts to disperse the Bauchi radicals, the British government transferred Aminu to Maru in Sokoto, appointing him as the headmaster of a newly constructed teachers' training college.

=== Sokoto ===
Sokoto had served as the capital of the 19th-century Sokoto Caliphate, established through the jihad of Usman dan Fodio. The caliphate covered a large majority of Northern Nigeria and most of the emirs owed allegiance to the Sultan of Sokoto. After the colonisation of the state by the British during the early 20th-century, Sokoto became a province and the Sultan's status was reduced; the other emirs answered directly to the British government, no longer to the Sultan. However, it retained its significance as the center of traditional and religious authority in the region. Hence, it was considered the most conservative section of a very conservative North. Maru (now located in Maru, Zamfara state), a village in the province, had a population of 8,256 in 1964. It was clear that Aminu's transfer to Maru was not only meant to distance him from Zungur but also to isolate him and impede his activities. Upon his arrival, he attempted to set up a discussion circle but there were too few educated people around him and the nearest large town to Maru was 35 miles away, "over terrible, barely passable roads". The Sultan, Siddiq Abubakar III, was also monitoring him, as Aminu later discovered. He learned that an elderly man he regularly gave alms to was a spy for the Sultan several weeks into his stay in Maru.

Throughout his time in Maru, Aminu found himself in confrontations that regularly put him at odds with the Sultan. It started when Aminu dismissed the Sultan's Yan Labari, or spies, after his arrival. Later, he sent a letter of complaint to the British authorities, alleging that funds intended for the farmers, whose land was used for the school, had not reached them. Another dispute arose when Aminu and Abubakar Gumi, a colleague of Aminu and later Grand Khadi of Northern Nigeria, almost caused a Qadiriyya-Tijaniyya feud in the province when they prevented their students from attending a Friday service due to an issue with the imam's ablution. According to the two, the imam of Maru practiced tayammum, an act reserved for when water suitable for ablution is scarce, despite there being no scarcity of water in Maru. A commission of inquiry set up by the Sultan acquitted Gumi and urged the Sultan to personally intervene in Maru to halt the practice of tayammum. Despite the commission's recommendation, the Sultan refused to comply and declined to dismiss the Imam.

At that time, Aminu shared a cordial relationship with Ahmadu Bello, the Sardauna of Sokoto, who held a rivalry with the Sultan. When the Sultan's court convicted Bello of jangali tax ('cattle tax') misappropriations in 1943, Aminu contributed a significant portion of his Bauchi teaching salary to Bello's defense fund. With Aminu now in Maru, Bello saw him as a potential ally against the Sultan. Bello frequently visited Aminu in Maru, and during a visit by Aminu to Sokoto for a provincial constitutional conference, he stayed at Bello's residence. During this period, the Sultan extended a private invitation to Aminu, likely seeking reconciliation. He requested a discreet 2 a.m. meeting, but upon learning that Aminu had told Bello about this invitation, the Sultan grew furious and canceled the meeting.

==== Northern People's Congress ====
Due to the successes of Aminu's teachers' union, other notable learned men around the region approached him regarding the establishing of a similar organisation. During late 1948, various organisations in Zaria, Kaduna and Bauchi merged to form the Jam'iyyar Mutanen Arewa or Northern People's Congress (NPC). In June 1949, the organisation's inaugural meeting was held at the Green's Hotel in Kaduna with about 500 in attendance. The founding members included Dr. R. A. B. Dikko, Yahaya Gusau, Abubakar Imam (editor of Gaskiya Ta Fi Kwabo), Yusuf Maitama Sule, Aliyu Mai Bornu, Aminu Kano, Isa Wali (Aminu's cousin) and Sa'adu Zungur, who was the general secretary of the National Council of Nigeria and the Cameroons (NCNC) at the time.

In its first general meeting in December 1949, the leaders of the congress, Dikko and Gusau, declared that the congress did not intend to subvert the colonial and aristocratic government and that the:

Jam'iyyar does not intend to usurp the authority of our Natural rulers; on the contrary, it is our ardent desire to enhance such authority whenever and wherever possible. We want to help our Natural rulers in the proper discharge of their duties...We want to help them in enlightening the Talakawa [common people].

A district officer, representing the Resident of Kano, cautioned the attendees that they could only bring about their desired reforms if they moved "slowly with caution" and that "one must learn to walk before one can run". Aminu responded by asking him to report to his superiors that:

If we go on foot, we will not walk, we will run. And if we fall, we will pick ourselves up and run again. But mark you, we will not go on foot. You might tell us to go by camel, or horse, but we will even skip the motor car and go by plane. And the British had best not deny us the choice of our means of transportation, no matter how fast.

Several Northern rulers, such as the Sultan, Emir of Kano and the Emir of Zaria, approved of this 'harmless' and 'deferential' attitude of the congress. However, younger members like Maitama, Aminu, and Zungur believed the congress was too uncritical of both the emirs and British authorities, emphasising the need for political reform in the North. Finally in August 1950, some radical NPC members in Kano formed the Northern Elements Progressive Union (Jamiyar Neman Sawaba), the first declared political party in Northern Nigeria. NEPU was influenced by Zungur's openly radical Northern Elements Progressive Association. They had the support of Aminu, who was unable to join the party at the time as he was still employed by the government and could not openly join a political party.

==== Resignation ====
Aminu handed in his resignation letter on 16 October 1950 and departed from Maru for good on 4 November of the same year. Sheikh Usman Bida, who was a classmate of Aminu at Kaduna College, and Sule Katagum, Wazirin Katagum, both believed that he was forced to resign. Aminu himself had contemplated this move as early as April of that year. When the deputy director of Education for the North warned him that he would not be reappointed if he persisted in his political activities, Aminu noted in his diary, "All right, that's his problem. Mine is to resign by next year."

An article by Aminu explaining his reasons for resignation was published in the Daily Comet newspaper on 11 November 1950:

I resigned because I refuse to believe that this country is by necessity a prisoner of the Anglo-Fulani aristocracy—I resigned because I fanatically share the view that the Native Authorities ... are woefully hopeless in solving our urgent educational, social, economic, political or even religious problems—My stay in England...has hardened my soul in elevating truth, freedom and above all human rights for which the world fought off fascism—I had twice been threatened with the merciless fangs... while all around are piled corruption, misrule, political bluff, slavery under another garb, naked nepotism, tyranny, poverty...unnecessary retention of hereditary parasites, naked and shameless economic exploitation...I cannot tolerate these things because of their awful smell...I am prepared to be called by any name. Call me a dreamer or call me a revolutionary; call me a crusader or anything this imperialist government wills. I have seen a light on the far horizon and I intend to march into its full circle either alone or with anyone who cares to go with me. To these same suppressors of our people, I say this: Look Out! Africa is a sleeping giant no more! She is just about to shake off the stupor...?"

== Political career ==
=== Pre-Independence (1950—1959) ===
Nepotism, poverty in its nakedness, disease, slavery under another garb, injustice and shameless greed are as common as they had been before the abrupt advent of the 19th-century imperialism. The promotion or appointment of illiterate men, young or grey bearded, to high offices of state usually for the mere accident of birth or for the "hypocritical nearness" is not only enough to rob the people of their intelligence and initiative but also a proof to show that this organised autocracy is a replica of the native un-Islamic rule which the British imperialism premeditated not to abolish.

— In Aminu's 1953 review of Dr. Walter Miller's "Have We failed in Nigeria?"

After his resignation, Aminu returned to Kano and formally joined Northern Elements Progressive Union (NEPU) party. The stated goals of the party included the "emancipation of the talakawa" (commoners) through "reform of the present autocratic political institutions". During the second annual convention of the Northern Peoples' Congress (NPC) in December 1950, a resolution by NEPU, drafted by Aminu, called for the NPC to be declared as "an explicitly nationalist political party". It became evident that a political party was needed for the North, to keep up with the continued democratisation of the country. However, powerful emirs and "certain administrative officers" viewed the NPC as a group with dangerously radical ideas. Concerns from moderate and conservative members arose, with fears that the NPC, if viewed as radical, would struggle to be the dominant party in the North. Several NPC members threatened to withdraw from the organisation if the NEPU members were not expelled.

Shehu Shagari, as leader of the Sokoto Youth Social Circle wing of the NPC, was given instructions to oppose any bid by both Aminu and Zungur for leadership positions at the 1950 Jos convention of the NPC. Shagari, on his way to the convention, met Aminu and Zungur on a train and informed them of this instruction. He claimed that Aminu, upon hearing of this, encouraged him to "exercise the mandate I had been given" and assured him of their continued friendship and respect. Consequently, NEPU withdrew from the NPC, forming an independent political party.

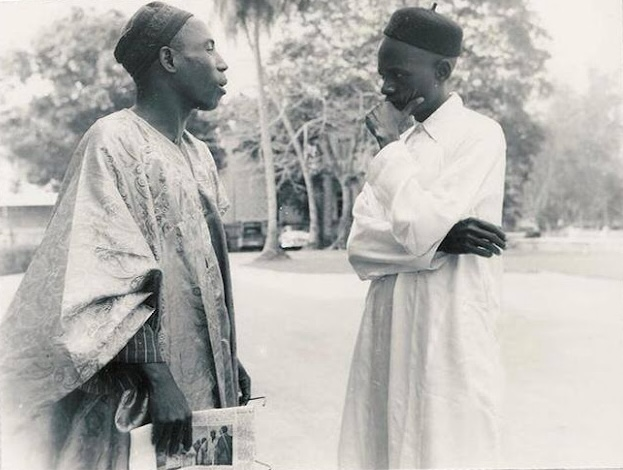
Aminu and Bello Ijumu of the United Middle Belt Congress before the 1956 general elections.

Aminu participated in the primary voting phase of the first parliamentary election in September 1951 for the Northern House of Assembly. His party, NEPU, secured victory with 12 out of the 26 seats allocated for Kano city, outperforming the other three parties, including Native Administration officials who collectively held six seats. The subsequent stage involved the final colleges, which elected candidates to the House of Assembly through a secret ballot. These colleges, comprising relatively small groups, each cast several hundreds votes or less. Despite NEPU's success in the earlier stages, Aminu was less fortunate in the final voting process, receiving 16 votes out of 68, and no NEPU member secured a position in the 1952 House of Assembly, which served as an electoral college for the House of Representatives. Four NEPU members, initially successful in the intermediate stage, found themselves competing against previously defeated candidates from the Native Authority during the final stage. Because of the outcome of the elections, it was perceived that British officials and the Native Authority had devised an electoral system that favoured the Native Authority, and "a high proportion of elected members became defenders of its interests". Sir Bryan Sharwood-Smith, former Governor of Northern Nigeria, 'wished' that Aminu had won the election as it "might have taken some of the bitterness out of Aminu's system" and that "[Northern Nigeria] needed all the able men it could muster, and of Aminu's ability there could be no question". A mass rally of "15,000 souls [taxpayers]" by NEPU was organised in Kano to protest this outcome. The party organised mock elections to show that direct elections could be conducted in an orderly fashion. NEPU managed to raise enough funds to send Aminu to England "to plead their case before the British Parliament and the general public". With the help of Thomas Hodgkin and John Collins, Aminu was able to meet members of the House of Lords, Fabian MPs, and the British Secretary of State. The Native Authority retaliated by harassing and jailing NEPU members around Kano, notably physically assaulting Gambo Sawaba, the influential women's rights activist and leader of NEPU's women's wing. The NPC, now the leading political party in the North, also employed 'a group of hooligans' who were colloquially known as Yan Mahaukata ('mad people') or Jam'iyyar Mahaukata ('Madmen's Party'), to harass members of other political parties in Kano, particularly NEPU members. In addition to establishing the Positive Action Wing (PAW) to counter these aggressions, some members of the British Parliament, such as Fenner Brockway, put pressure on the colonial government to cease the repressive actions. The PAW was eventually dissolved in 1954 as it turned out to be even more violent than the Yan Mahaukata.

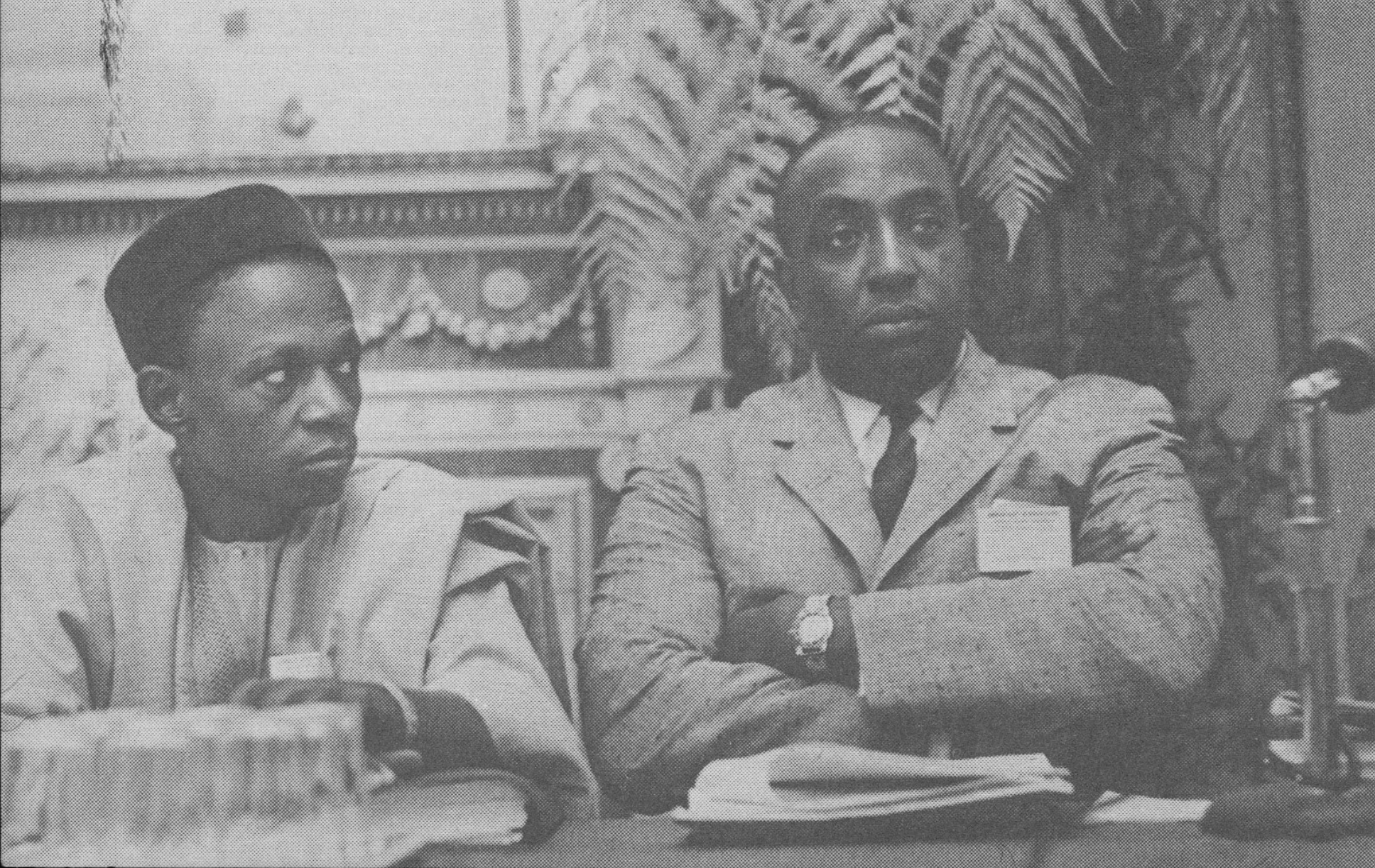
Aminu (L) at the second annual conference of American Society of African Culture in 1959. At the conference, he gave a lecture on "The Problem of African Education".

Due to his high status within the party Aminu was well protected against the physical violence the other NEPU members suffered. However, Aminu faced numerous arrests by the Native Authority. Notably, during the federal election campaign of 1954, he was convicted twice. First, for flying NEPU's flag on his car in Kano city—an act traditionally reserved for the Emir of Kano and the British Resident. Second, for publishing articles with alleged 'seditious intent,' resulting in a three-day imprisonment for the former and a £50 fine for the latter. In another incident, he was accused of heresy by a group of mallamai, led by Nasiru Kabara. The accusation centered around the belief that the wearing of Sawaba buttons by NEPU members was un-Islamic, and NEPU was alleged to be collaborating with Christians against the religious leaders of the North. Accompanied by his advisers Danladi and Lawan Dambazau, Aminu appeared before the Emir's council of Kano to address these charges. Given the gravity of the accusations, he and the aforementioned advisers "performed the ablutions of a man facing impending death (last rites)". At the meeting, Aminu pointed out that the emir's council was not a debating society and that discussions should be held separately and later reported to the emir. This was agreed and a second meeting was scheduled. At this second meeting, Aminu said that NEPU's alliance with National Council of Nigeria and the Cameroons (NCNC) was not against Islamic teachings as even Muhammad once made a defense alliance with Jews around Medina. He also said that the Emir of Kano himself had recently consulted Christian Igbo engineers to work on the Great Mosque of Kano in the 1950s. On the matter of the Sawaba buttons, Aminu questioned if it was also considered un-Islamic when some emirs wore the medal of the British Order of St. George. A compromise was eventually reached and NEPU members were only allowed to wear party badges at mass rallies.

Aminu was elected the President-General of NEPU at the third annual convention of the party in 1953, succeeding Abba Maikwaru. A year later, the party formed an alliance with Nnamdi Azikiwe's National Council of Nigeria and the Cameroons (NCNC). He contested in the 1954 Federal elections for Kano East but lost to Maitama Sule. During the 1956 regional elections, Aminu contested for the Kano East constituency. He lost the election to Ahmadu Dantata, one of the wealthiest Nigerians and heir to the Dantata business empire. The election, conducted on the basis of male taxpayer suffrage, concluded with Dantata securing 2,119 votes against Aminu's 1,776.

The 1959 Nigerian general election marked a significant milestone as the first election featuring direct voting in every constituency. Aminu, running under the NEPU-NCNC alliance, again contested for the Kano East constituency and received 60.4% of the votes, securing a seat in the Federal House of Representatives. At the House, he was appointed the position of the Deputy Government Chief Whip, and Chairman of the Alliance Committee on foreign affairs and is reported to have declined a ministerial appointment as he deemed it 'unseemly' to accept a position "with prestige and no power" with about 2,000 of his party followers in prison.

=== First Republic (1960—1966) ===
As a Parliamentarian, Aminu directed his attention toward national and international issues affecting the newly independent Nigeria, while maintaining his main objective of the emancipation of the talakawa. At the House, he proposed several ways to support and speed up the country's decolonisation efforts. With regard to Nigeria's foreign policy, Aminu was a staunch advocate of pan-Africanism, arguing that Nigeria should become "the base for struggle against the white domination". He persistently pushed for Nigeria to increase its support for anti-apartheid efforts in South Africa and encouraged the continued involvement of Nigeria in restoring "peace and dignity in the Congo". Appointed as a United Nations (UN) delegate by the Prime Minister of Nigeria, Abubakar Tafawa Balewa, his former colleague from Bauchi, Aminu was less radical relative to his local activities. During his tenure at the UN, particularly on international matters, he aligned himself with "progressivism and vigilant neutralism." As a militant pan-Africanist, he advocated for a non-aligned position for Nigeria, believing in the cause of 'non-bloc diplomacy'.

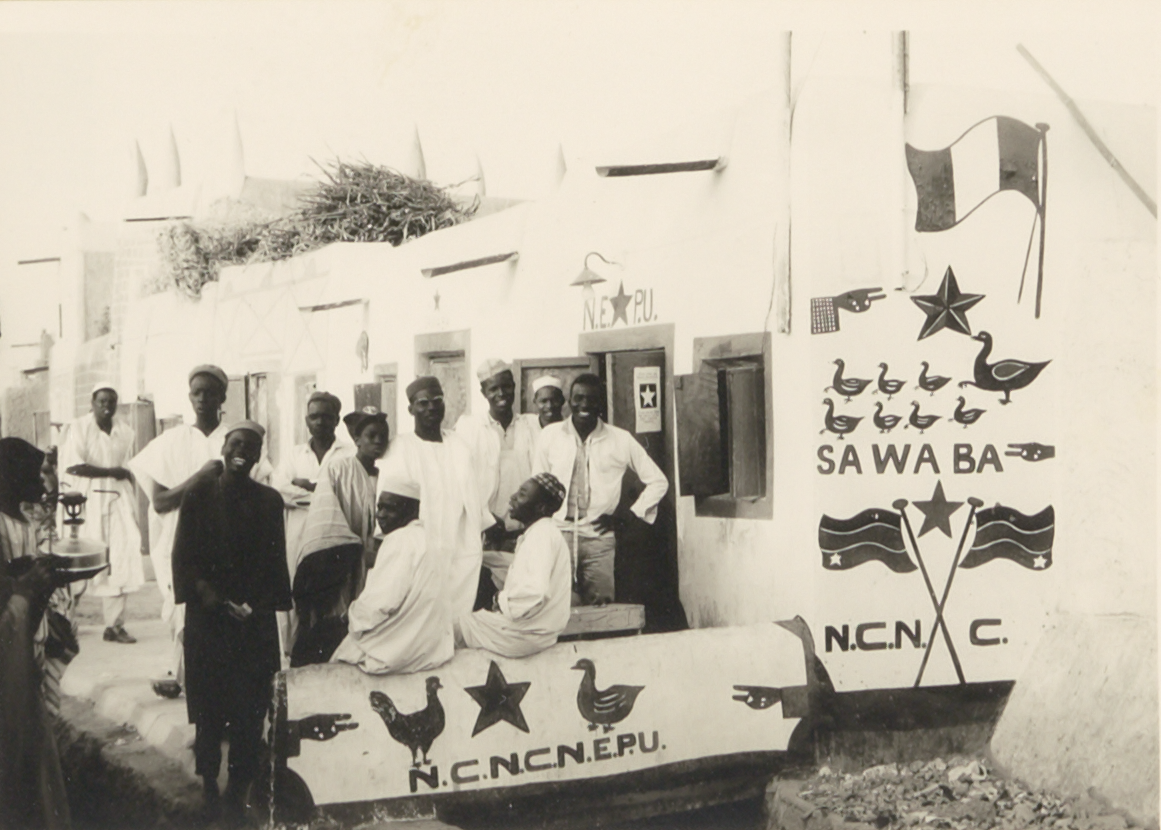
An NCNC-NEPU office (1962)

During Aminu's tenure in the House in Lagos, managing NEPU became increasingly challenging. In early 1961, Joseph Tarka, leader of the United Middle Belt Congress (UMBC), proposed an alliance between NEPU and his party to form a potent coalition to challenge the NPC in the North. However, the condition was that NEPU would support UMBC's goal of creating a separate Middle Belt state. While Aminu saw potential benefits in the coalition, he declined due to UMBC's affiliation with the Action Group (AG). He interpreted the proposal as an indirect attempt by the AG to sever NCNC's ties with NEPU, their main opposition in the south. Despite opposition from some NEPU members, the UMBC proposal gained popularity, and Aminu's rejection faced criticism. NEPU's poor performance in the 1961 elections for the Northern House of Assembly, where they won only one seat, added to the party's internal instability. In 1963, Muhammad Sanusi was deposed by the Northern Regional Government as Emir of Kano. Aminu suspected Ahmadu Bello, the Premier of Northern Nigeria and NPC leader, of being behind the deposition. He distributed posters and propaganda drawing parallels to the historical rivalry between Sokoto and Kano. Sanusi was replaced by the ageing Muhammad Inuwa, who had a cordial relationship with Aminu. Sanusi's supporters formed the Kano People's Party (KPP), aiming for his return or his son Ado Sanusi's ascension. The KPP allied with NEPU, albeit without a commitment to Sanusi's restoration. NPC, in an attempt to salvage support in Kano, called for its supporters to greet the new Emir. After NEPU supporters were harassed at the gathering, they organised a larger gathering the next day with 35,000 people in attendance, where the Emir received them positively. Inuwa died the day after this gathering and Bello, in an attempt to avoid further unrest, appointed Ado Bayero, Sanusi's half-brother and Nigeria's ambassador to Senegal, as his replacement. Sanusi's deposition significantly impacted NEPU's support in Kano and heightened tensions between Kano and Sokoto, particularly within the Sufi brotherhoods Tijanniyya and Qadriyya. Although Aminu remained unaffiliated with any Sufi brotherhood, he understood their significance in Northern Nigeria and leveraged the rivalries to advance NEPU's interests. During the 1964 Federal election campaigns, Aminu visited Sheikh Ibrahim Niass, the influential Tijanni leader, in Kaolack resulting in photos of Aminu receiving blessings from the Sheikh circulating in Northern Nigeria.

==== 1964 General election ====
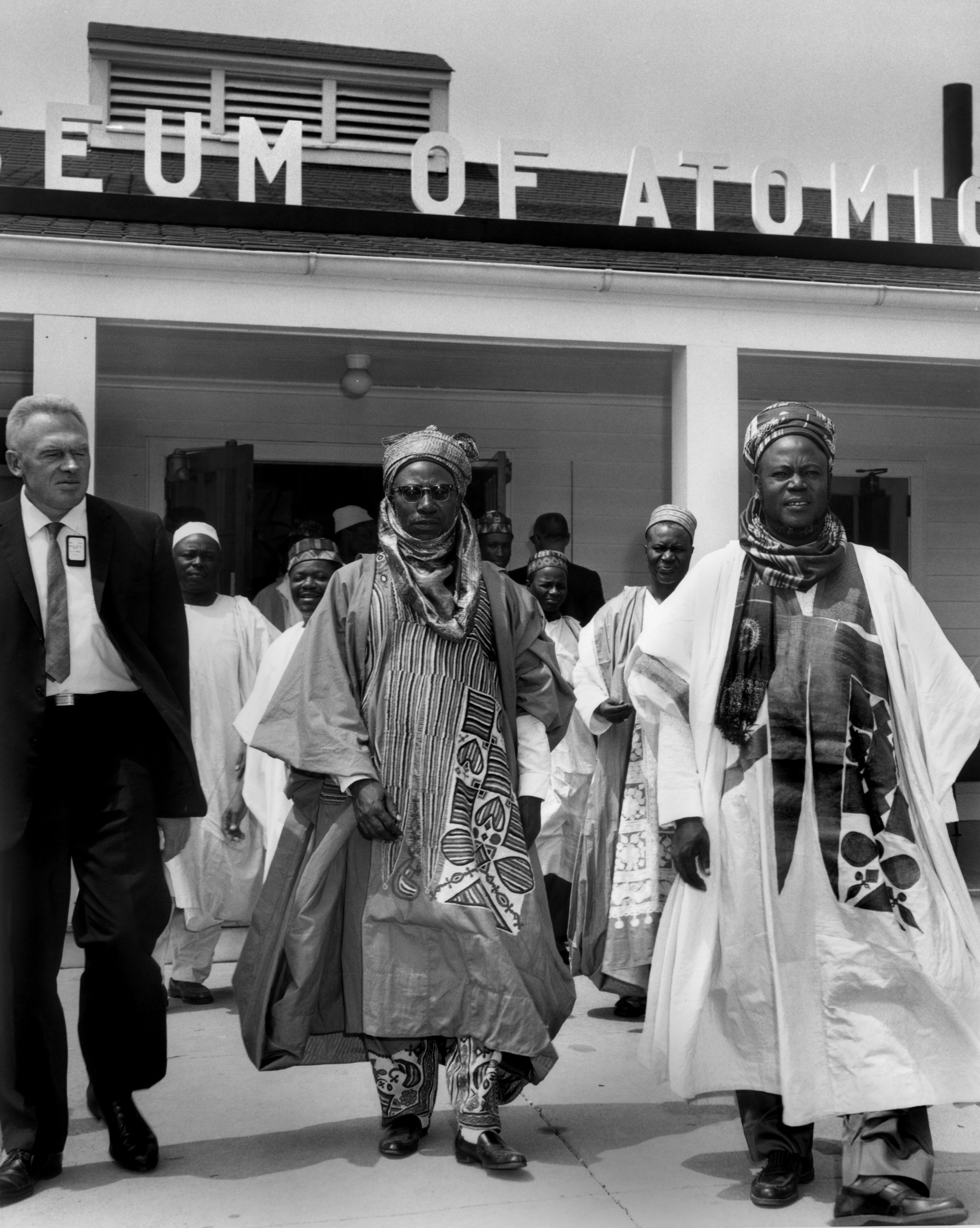
Sarkin Kano Muhammad Sanusi I (M) and Sir Ahmadu Bello (R) leaving the Atomic Museum in Oak Ridge, United States (1960)

After UMBC ended its alliance with the Action Group, NEPU and UMBC formed the Northern Progressive Front (NPF), aiming to "breakup of the monolithic Northern Region, to give adequate voice to the larger minority groups". The KPP and other smaller groups joined the NPF, with hopes of establishing a separate, independent Kano state. As the country approached elections, all three regions experienced heightened unrest and allegations of corruption. In Kano, Aminu, as NEPU's leader, met with Ibrahim Gashash, NPC party leader, to mitigate potential violence by agreeing on electoral conduct. Gashash agreed to persuade his party leaders to avoid bloody clashes "but all to no avail". On 28 December, just two days before the election, President Azikiwe urged Prime Minister Balewa to postpone the election for six months due to escalating unrest and requested UN monitoring. Balewa rejected the request, claiming that it was beyond his authority. The chairman of the Federal Electoral Commission, without consulting other members, also dismissed it. Which led to three out of six commission members resigning. The perceived injustices and alleged corruption lead to several candidates and parties to boycott the election, resulting in 'lopsided' results. Aminu lost his Kano East constituency to the NPC candidate, Mahmud Dantata, son of Alhassan Dantata and former NEPU member, with Dantata receiving 1,700 votes against Aminu's 690 out of 40,000 eligible voters.

Following the election, Aminu and the central working committee of NEPU organised a convention to restrategise. A "White Paper on Political Problems Facing Nigeria" was written to be presented, which evaluated NEPU's role and proposed organisational adjustments. This convention marked the largest in the party's history, with delegates from hundreds of branches across the North in attendance. Among the topics discussed included the possibility of the unification of all opposition political parties in the North, the formation of an "all-encompassing national party", the creation of new states, establishing a scholarship aid. The convention also led to the inception of the Kano State Movement (KSM), comprising NEPU, KPP, and some dissident NPC members. On 14 April 1965, a mass gathering was held to inaugurate the KSM, drawing one of the largest crowds in Northern Nigerian political history. Ahmadu Trader, Aminu's long-time friend, was appointed its first president and Aminu its political adviser. The KSM's primary goal was the formation of a separate Kano state.

In 1965, Prime Minister Balewa appointed Aminu as a UN delegate. Aminu represented Nigeria at the 1965 United Nations Conference on Trade and Development. Upon his return from UN duties, on 6 January 1966, Aminu traveled from Lagos to Kano to attend a NEPU conference, where discussions on ways to restrategise continued. Upon his arrival in Kano, Aminu was informed through Abubakar Gumi, the Grand Khadi (Chief Justice) of the Northern Region and Aminu's former colleague in Maru, about a secret meeting arranged by Ahmadu Bello, who was then in Mecca. The meeting was to be between the three of them and was scheduled for 16 January 1966. However, just before the meeting could take place, Bello was assassinated on 15 January. While Bello's intentions for the meeting remain unclear due to his untimely demise, Gumi's opinion was that he might have been reconsidering the level of repression in the North and sought to negotiate an electoral agreement for the upcoming Northern Regional Assembly elections.

=== Military rule (1966—1979) ===
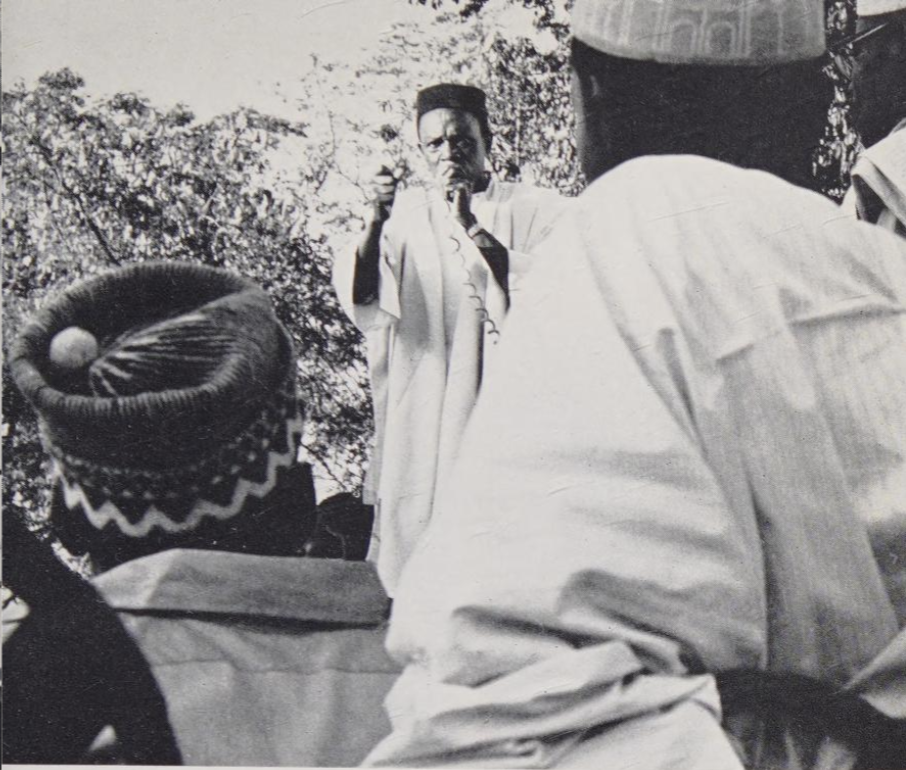
A political rally of Aminu during the 1960s

Between 14 and 15 January 1966, rebel soldiers of the Nigerian Army led by Kaduna Nzeogwu and four others assassinated several influential Nigerians including Sir Abubakar Tafawa Balewa, Prime Minister of Nigeria, Sir Ahmadu Bello, Sardauna of Sokoto and Premier of Northern Nigeria, and Chief Ladoke Akintola, Premier of Western Nigeria. This coup attempt instigated an anti-coup movement within the army, led by the General Officer Commanding, Johnson Aguiyi-Ironsi, which managed to thwart the coup. Following the failed coup, on 16 January, Aguiyi-Ironsi assumed the position of Head of State, leading Nigeria's first Military Government.

==== Ironsi's regime ====
Despite the optimism among his fellow NEPU members, who believed they could fill the political vacuum left by the coup, Aminu approached the Ironsi regime cautiously. Representing his party, he sent a 'cautiously worded' telegram to the government, avoiding swearing allegiance but expressing hope that the Ironsi regime would unite the nation and advance democratisation. Ironsi quickly became unpopular in the North and West regions due to his disregard for the political class of these regions, favouring the emirs and chiefs instead . The only influential political figures in the new administration were the former Governors, now serving as advisers to the military governors. The new situation in the North began to resemble the old indirect rule of the British colonialists, which further increased the animosity against the regime, especially within the radical circles. Three months into his rule, Aminu was holding talks with Joseph Tarka and Maitama Sule regarding what they considered "a common threat to Nigeria". Around the time of this meeting, Ironsi eventually agreed to set up a meeting with Aminu. Aminu outlined the challenges facing the North and proposed solutions. Ironsi, however, seemed to be unintrested, hence, Aminu's efforts were "to no avail". Subsequently, Aminu relied on the relatively conservative Ado Bayero, the Emir of Kano, to convey his radical ideas to the Supreme Commander.

In May, Ironsi issued the controversial "Unification Decree" which abolished the regions of Nigeria and replaced with "groups of provinces". Additionally, the Decree unified the previously regionalised civil services. He further abolished all political parties and cultural associations in an attempt to attack 'tribalism'. The announcement of the Decree heightened tensions in the North, where the majority of the elite groups felt increasingly alienated from the government in Lagos. They felt that the Decree was not adequately discussed with them and contained conditions "unfavourable to them". In Kano, around two hundred students, mostly from Abdullahi Bayero College, Rumfa College, and the School for Arabic Studies, organised a protest and presented the Emir of Kano a written statement to deliver to the Military Governor of the Northern Region, Hassan Katsina. The following day, riots broke out in the city, with the rioters targeting Igbo traders, resulting in the deaths of around 100 to 200 persons, primarily Igbos but also including others caught in the disturbances. A tribunal was established to investigate the riots, with its head being Sir Lionel Brett, a British judge of the Nigerian Supreme Court. Sir Brett's tribunal never passed its judgement as Ironsi's regime ended after he was killed on 29 July 1966.

In July, Ironsi organised a conference with the country's most influential emirs and chiefs in Ibadan. During the conference, he instructed them on singing the national anthem and expressed his intention to post them roles around Nigeria similar to the military governors, a suggestion that was so controversial, Sarkin Kano Ado Bayero walked out of the conference. On 29 July 1966, a counter-coup led mostly by officers from the North was launched, resulting in Ironsi's assassination in Ibadan. On 1 August 1966, Lt-Colonel Yakubu Gowon was appointed Head of State after being requested by the Supreme Military Council (SMC) to assume command.

==== Gowon's regime (1966—1975) ====
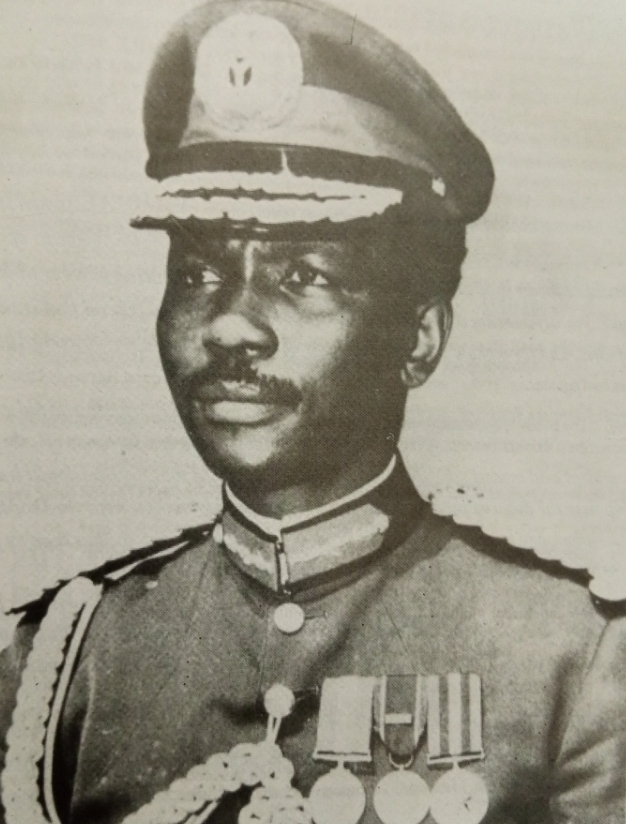
General Yakubu Gowon

The appointment of Gowon, a Christian northerner from a minority ethnic group, as Head of State was a move by the SMC to dissuade the Northern coupists, led by Lt-Colonel Murtala Muhammed, from seceding from the republic. Gowon promptly released most of the political prisoners detained during Ironsi's regime, including Obafemi Awolowo, the influential Yoruba politician from the Western region. He also revoked the controversial Unification Decree and reinstated the previously abolished four regions. Additionally, Gowon organised a conference of regional representatives to devise new constitutional principles, known as the Ad Hoc constitutional committee. Aminu and Joseph Tarka were among the Northern region's representatives at the conference. All delegates at the conference, except the Easterners, supported the idea of a strong federal government based on small states.

Immediately after the announcement of Gowon's appointment, Aminu helped organise discussions with the North's "leaders of thought" in Kaduna, comprising civil servants and First Republic politicians. The discussions revolved around the direction of the new government, with discussion papers drafted and presented for consideration, modification, or rejection by the group. Prior to the convening of Gowon's ad hoc committee, the discussion group discussed the topic of new states and Aminu was chosen to head the subcommittee. Aminu represented the Kaduna group at the Ad Hoc Conference in Lagos, presenting their recommendation for the creation of 12 to 14 states, with 7 for the North and 5 for the South. However, the Conference ultimately divided the states evenly, with 6 for both North and South. In the initial two months of Gowon's administration, Aminu held three separate meetings with him. The first involved a ten-man delegation from the North, the second as a member of the Ad Hoc Committee, the third meeting involved Aminu as part of a five-man committee of Northerners, led by Sir Kashim Ibrahim, a former NPC politician and the last civilian Governor of Northern Nigeria, convened by Gowon to convince them on the necessity for a strong federal government and national unity.

With the North now in support of a strong federal government, following Gowon's successful persuasion of Ibrahim's delegation, and the West also in support after Chief Awolowo eventually "came around" to the idea, only the Eastern region remained in opposition. The Igbo dominated East harbored distrust toward the military led government, likely due to the "pogrom-like" violence they endured shortly after the July coup, carried out by rogue soldiers seeking revenge for the January coup. In his diary entry on 4 October 1966, Aminu noted "Account of army mutiny most disheartening. Speed and action required. East on way to secession." In an attempt to hasten the return to civilian government, Aminu approached the leaders of the Ad Hoc Committee, Awolowo (West), Kashim Ibrahim (North), Anthony Enahoro (Mid-West) and 'Eni' (East), to initiate talks on establishing an interim government. However, his efforts were interrupted by the eruption of violence in the North.

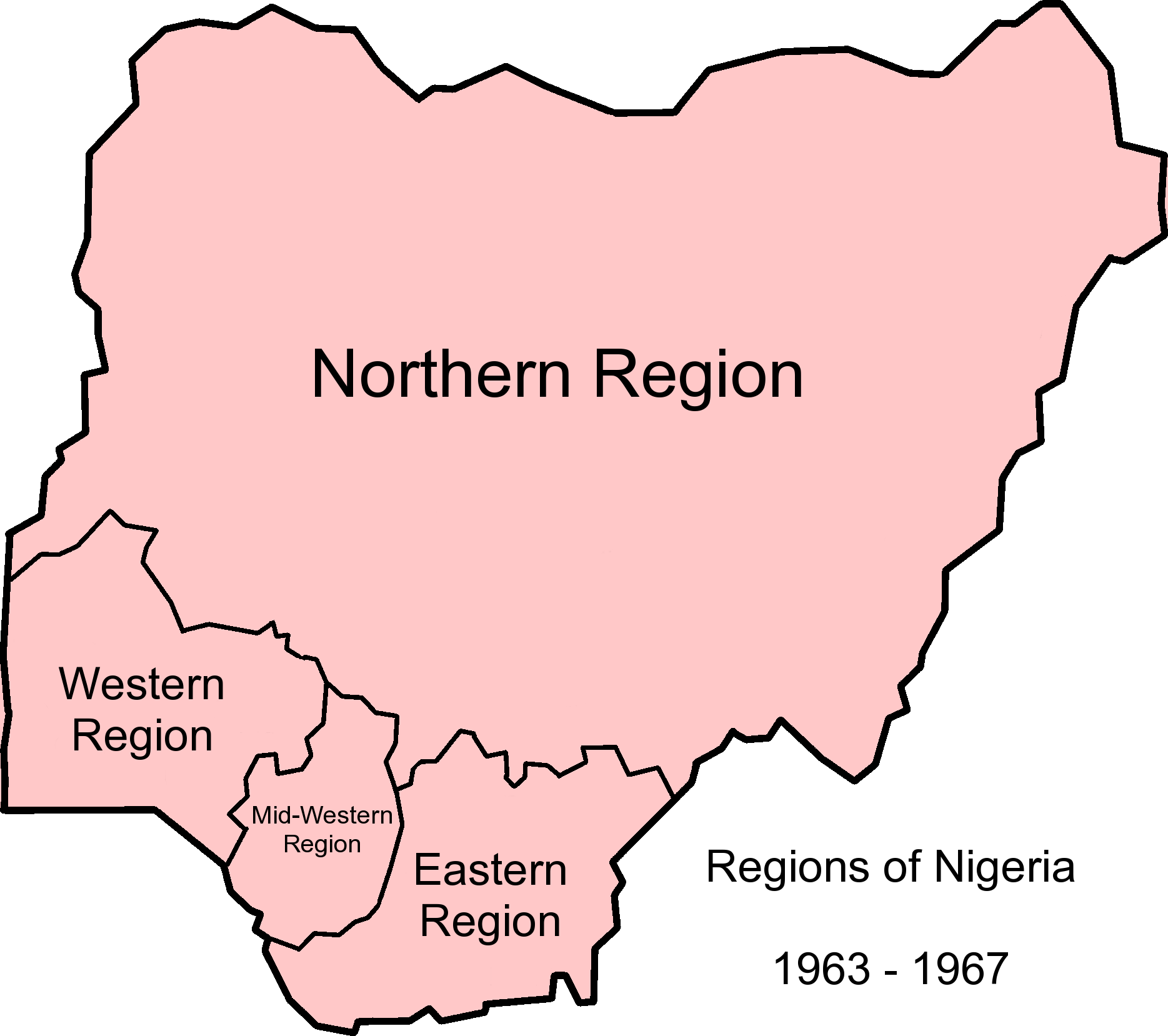
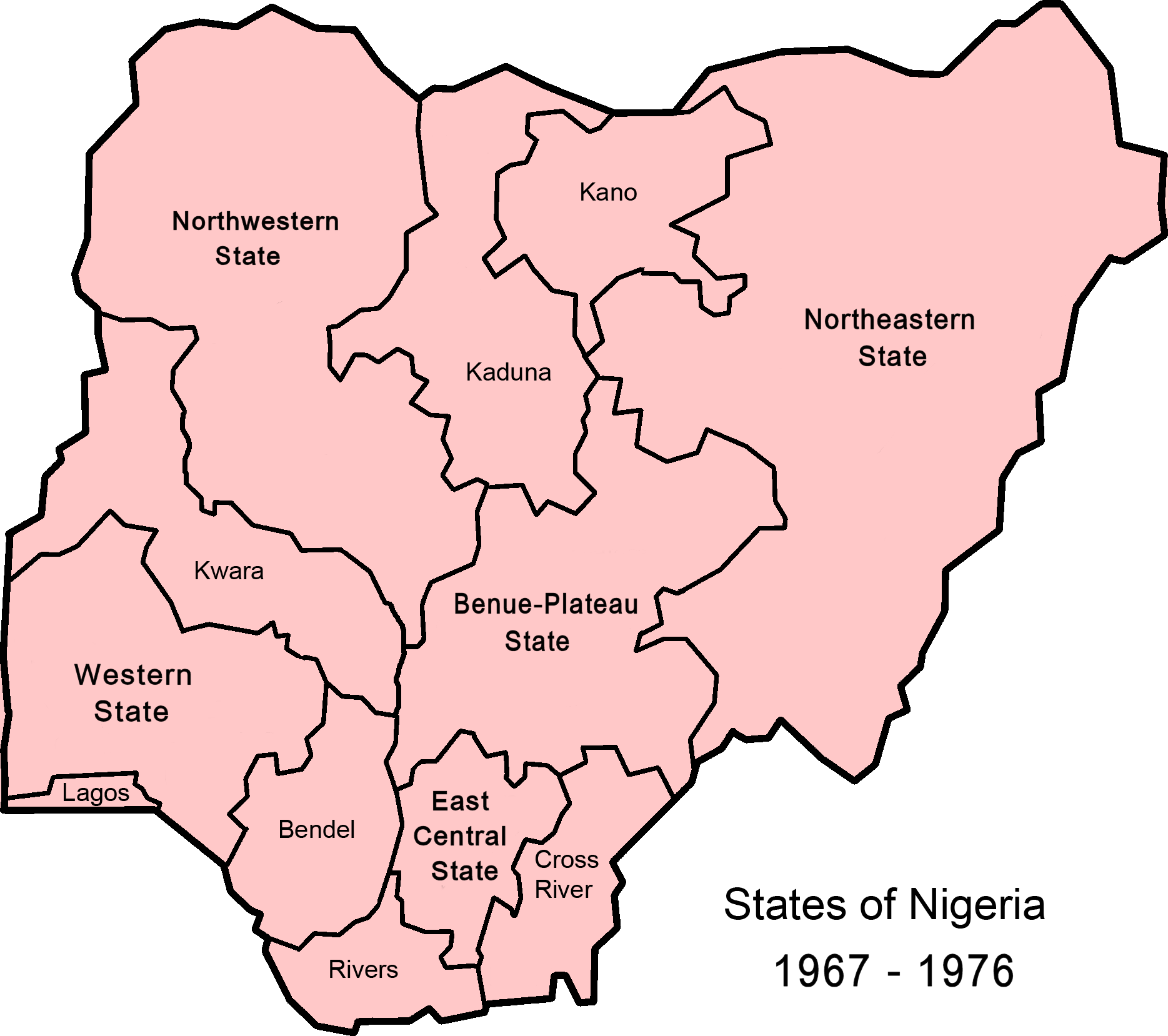
The four regions of Nigeria (top) replaced by twelve states (bottom) in 1967 by the Gowon administration.

Among the three major instances of large outbreak of violence in 1966, the one in October was "by far the most massive in terms of deaths". The violence was carried out by Northern soldiers and local thugs, notably the yan daba in Kano. As a result, many Igbos residing in the North fled to the East in search of safety. After enduring another massacre, the Eastern region refused to return to the Ad Hoc conferences. By the end of the violence, "all Ibos had fled the North, and Hausas the East". The mass flight of about a million Easterners brought the economy of the North to a near standstill. The sudden departure of clerks, technicians, traders, and civil servants severely impacted the region's economy, with services only able to recover to about 40% of pre-coup levels six weeks later. To help solve this issue, Aminu established the Kano Community Commercial School (now known as Aminu Kano Community Commercial College). Hassan Katsina, Military-Governor of the North, agreed to help hasten the project, and Maitama Sule offered his home as the school's first location. Among the other people who supported the project were Sarkin Kano Ado Bayero, Aminu Dantata, Sani Gezawa, Inuwa Wada, and Tanko Yakasai. Aminu personally donated 250 pounds to the project, with total contributions amounting to approximately 4,000 pounds. Aminu served as the chairman of the school until his death in 1983. One of the school's most notable alumni is Aliko Dangote, the richest African.

In early January 1967, the Supreme Military Council (SMC) held a meeting in Aburi, Ghana, which historian Max Siollun described as "a historic constitutional debate that would determine Nigeria's future social and political structure". The most active participant in the meeting was Lt-Colonel C. Odumegwu-Ojukwu, the Military-Governor of the East, who put forth several suggestions. Among these suggestions, the most crucial ones were that regions must approve any decisions affecting them in the future, and all existing decrees contrary to this principle must be repealed. These suggestions, essentially advocating for regional autonomy, received unanimous agreement among all parties of the SMC. However, upon Gowon's return to Lagos, "his civil servants were aghast at the depth of his concessions to Ojukwu". Consequently, the Aburi Accords were never implemented, leading to the worsening of the relationship between the Eastern Region and the Federal Government. While this was ongoing, Aminu; Joseph Tarka, UMBC leader; Aliyu Makaman Bida, the most senior surviving NPC politician; and Umaru Dikko, as their secretary, were touring the North to inform the populace on current events and, most importantly, to discourage talks of seceding from the Federation. The tour included holding public discussions and meeting with the influential emirs and chiefs of the region. Not long after the tour, Aminu lost his cousin Isa Wali in February and his father in May.

On 27 May 1967, Gowon announced the division of Nigeria into twelve states. A move that was widely celebrated by the minority ethnic groups of the abolished four regions. A Federal Executive Council (FEC) was formed to serve under the Supreme Military Council. The FEC included appointed civilian representatives from each state and was to serve as the administrative arm of the government. Aminu was appointed as Kano State's representative and was given the position of the Federal Commissioner of Communications.

===== Civil war (1967—1970) =====
Three days following the division of the regions, Ojukwu declared the independence of the Eastern Region, which was to be known as the Republic of Biafra. After the government's failed attempts at a "police action", the Military-Government responded with land and sea blockades. Afterwards, the Biafran army invaded and seized control of the Mid-Western State (Bendel), leading to a declaration of war by Gowon.

Throughout the war, Aminu remained active as a member of the FEC. He led the procurement committee tasked with acquiring arms, which involved extensive travel around the world, including Europe, the United States, the Soviet Union, and North Africa, to negotiate arms deals. In May 1968, Aminu participated in peace talks between Nigeria and Biafra held in Kampala, Uganda, one year into the civil war. Chinua Achebe, the influential Nigerian writer, also attended the talks as part of the Biafran delegation. This meeting was the first time Achebe met Aminu, and he recalled:

I remember very well seeing Aminu Kano of the Nigerian delegation sitting in front and looking so distressed. This is one of the strongest impressions the man made on me, compared to people like Chief Enahoro who was the leader of the delegation swaggering as conquerors, and even Asika. Aminu Kano seemed to be so different; in fact, he seemed to be looking out of the window. While his colleagues were speaking arrogantly and bent on our surrender, Aminu Kano was calm and in pain. This was a man who was not pleased with either side or how the matter was being handled. That meeting made an indelible mark on me about Aminu Kano, about his character and his intellect.

Aminu approached the war not as a conflict against the Igbo people or the former Eastern Region, but as a war against secession. During a speech to students at Kano's Abdullahi Bayero College in February 1970, he urged Nigerians, and the government, to properly prepare for the return of Biafrans. Aminu stressed:

There is the problem of reintegration of the Ibos. They left a large part of this country, and a lot of what they left has been taken over by the indigenes of the place. What are they to do? This is important since we are fighting them to stay in Nigeria. We are saying, "You can't go away. You must remain Nigerian." When they come back, can you deny them the right to own plots or land? You can't do that. How can the common Ibo take that? They said, "We want to go away." We said, "No, you must remain in Nigeria." They will say, "Now we are back." What do we do? These are problems that must be faced. It is not a simple problem. It is not enough to say the houses in Sabon Gari, the houses in Tudun Wada, the houses in Kaduna are being taken care of. Will they come back? With their industry? With a bigger desire to stay in Nigeria? A lot of our sons and daughters went and died in the name of unity to contain the Ibos in Nigeria. Can you afford to ostracize them now? You can't. What are you going to do? What is your program? You must begin to plan from now. It is not enough ot say, "Oh yes, they are coming back."

===== Reforms in Kano State =====
In the newly created Kano State, there were two figures of national authority during the Gowon Administration. They were Audu Bako, the Military-Governor of Kano State, and Aminu, as civilian commissioner and a member of the FEC.

Extensive reforms were carried out in the State, particularly on the Emirate level. The former alkali courts were replaced with area courts, and the emir's court was disbanded. The federal and emirate police forces were merged and put under the control of the commissioner of police, appointed by the federal government. The districts of the Emirate were grouped into 8 administrative areas, each with an appointed district officer who is responsible to the secretary of the military governor. The Native Authority was replaced with the Local Government Authority (LGA), which mainly consists of the Emirate Council and the General Purposes Committee. The Emirate Council consists of 40 members with the emir as chairman. About two-thirds of the council members are representatives of districts and were chosen by election. The entire council was initially appointed by the military governor.

Despite the reduction of the emir's powers in Kano, particularly in the judicial field, he still held considerable influence at the LGA level. He retained the authority to appoint all district heads and could exert influence on executive and legislative matters across all levels. Bako outlined his three elements of policy regarding the reforms: to preserve the best elements of traditional emirate government in Kano, to bring those in authority closer to the people through representation; and to deal harshly with those who obstruct constituted authority. Although Aminu did not publicly address these reforms, he was widely identified as one of the leading reformers. Many of his earlier views on the decentralisation of emirate authority could be seen in the new structures of Kano State, and his ideas on removing land and judicial powers from the emir were well known. Bako apparently appointed his commissioners generally based on Aminu's recommendations.

==== Muhammad's regime (1975—1976) and Obasanjo's regime (1976—1979) ====
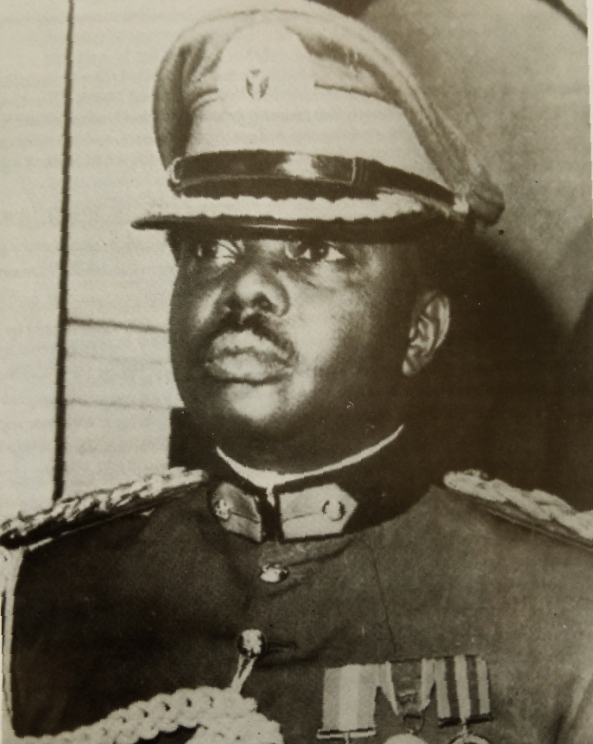
General Murtala Muhammad

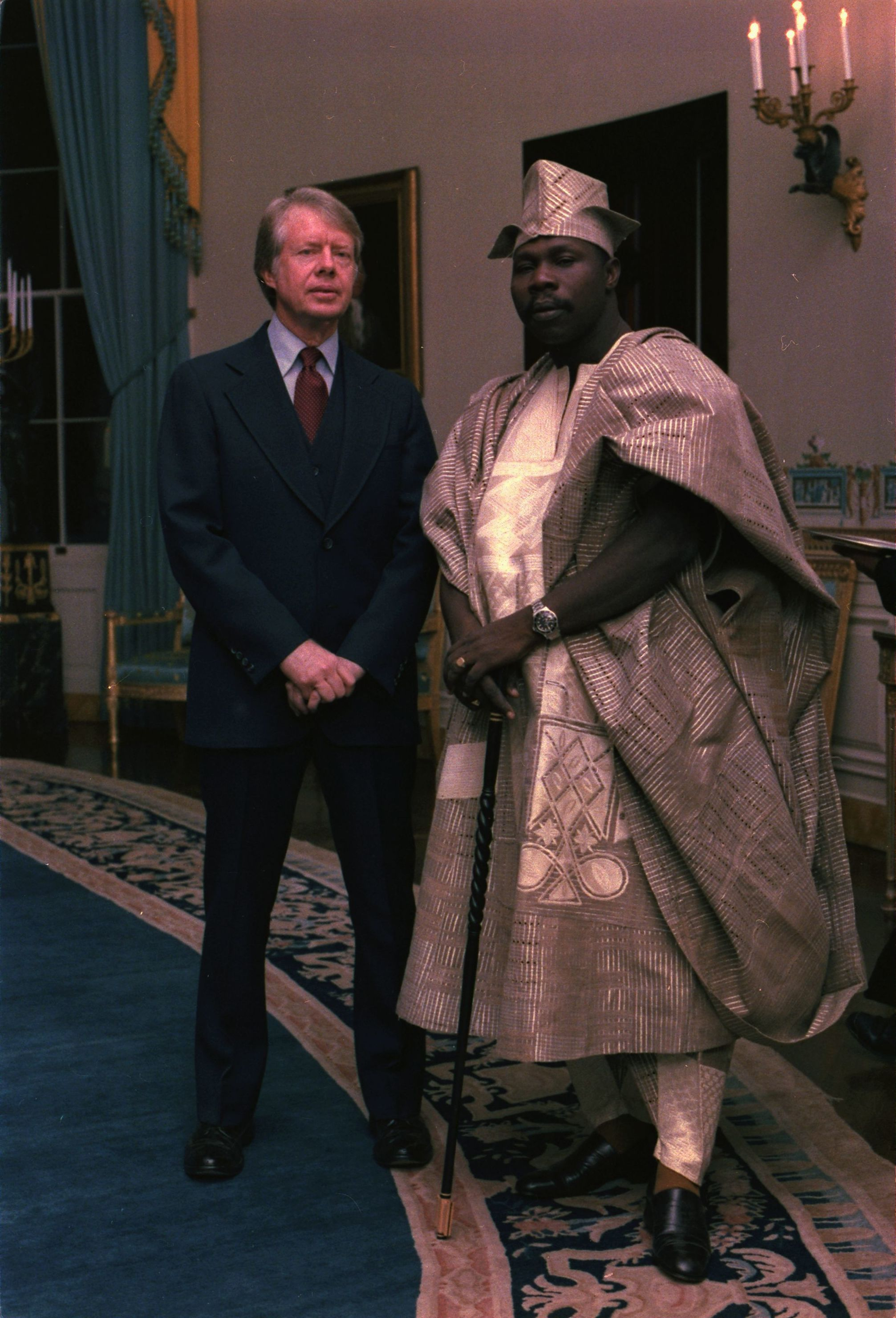
General Olusegun Obasanjo with US President Jimmy Carter in 1977

After the conclusion of the civil war, he assumed the position of Federal Commissioner of Health in 1971. In 1975, a coup d'état against Gowon was launched while Gowon was representing Nigeria at the 12th summit of the Organisation of African Unity in Kampala. Murtala Muhammad was announced as Head of State by the coupists on 30 July 1975. Muhammad was assassinated in a failed coup a year later, and he was succeeded by his deputy, Olusegun Obasanjo.

Before his death, Muhammad established a Constitution Drafting Committee (CDC) tasked with formulating a new constitution in preparation for the transition to civilian rule. In August 1976, Obasanjo announced the formation of a Constituent Assembly which was to deliberate upon the draft constitution the CDC had prepared. Elections for the Constituent Assembly were conducted, and candidates were chosen by the newly constituted Federal Electoral Commission (FEDECO). Aminu was nominated and successfully elected. The Assembly held sessions between October 1977 and June 1978. The Assembly's draft constitution was submitted to the Supreme Military Council in August. Following the SMC's approval of 17 amendments to the draft, the new constitution was announced in September 1978. The "ban on politics" was also lifted on the same day and Nigerians were encouraged to form political parties in preparation of an election the following year.

=== Second republic (1979—1983) ===
After General Muhammad announced the plan to return to civilian rule by 1979, Aminu reaching out to his contacts to form a political association. He also maintained relationships with student organisations nationwide. Aminu later joined a political association called the National Movement which was made up of influential figures, primarily from the North. The association was a direct successor to the Kaduna discussion group formed just after the 1966 counter-coup that ended the First Republic. The group held secret meetings throughout this period and eventually invited influential political figures in the South in an effort to "form a truly national party". After the ban on politics was lifted in September 1978, its successor, the National Party of Nigeria (NPN), was launched.

==== Formation of PRP ====
A day before the launch of NPN however, Aminu left the association to form and was holding a meeting in Yaba, Lagos. The NPN quickly sent Joseph Tarka and Inuwa Wada (who was his cousin) to persuade him to return. Aminu agreed to send five aides to the launch while he continued his meeting and was never to return to the NPN.

The precise reasons behind Aminu's departure from the NPN remain unknown, however, there are various differing theories. According to Shehu Shagari, an early member of the NPN and later the party's sole presidential candidate, a pre-inaugural meeting concluded that certain coordinating committee members should assume specific interim posts. Aminu was nominated for the position of publicity secretary by Chief Adisa Akinloye. However, he promptly proposed Tanko Yakasai instead, a former NEPU member whom he felt was a better person for the position as he had the relevant experience. It has been suggested by the NPN that Akinloye's suggestion lead to Aminu's resignation as it was considered "insulting to his national status". Shagari described this interpretation as "a plausible but erroneously derived deduction". The PRP later claimed that this interpretation was false as the position could have provided Aminu with "a good platform for image building".

A different perspective on the incident emerged from Aminu's political associates, particularly from Kano, such as Lawan Dambazau, Lili Gabari, Dauda Dangalan, and Sabo Bakin Zuwo. According to them, upon learning of Aminu's refusal to return to the NPN, Aminu Dantata hurried to Kano and convened a meeting at his residence with various influential figures, including businessmen, politicians, public servants, and professionals from Kano. The purpose of this gathering was to explore ways to persuade Aminu to reconcile with the NPN. Several attendees took turns addressing the issue and appealing to him to reunite with the party. Dr. Ibrahim Datti Ahmed, former President-General of the Supreme Council for Sharia in Nigeria, was eventually given the opportunity to speak, and according to Dambazau, "castigated Mallam Aminu as an enemy of the north; an enemy of traditional institutions; an enemy of Islam; and as such, they could not cohabit with him in the NPN". Dambazau noted that nobody defended Aminu nor attempted to restrain Datti during his speech. Following Datti's remarks, Aminu defended himself, and the meeting descended into chaos, leading to its postponement until the next day.

Aminu fell sick before the next meeting, and was bedridden for days. During his illness, Aminu's supporters from different parts of the country, including Balarabe Musa (from Kaduna), A.D. Yahya, Ananobi (from Port Harcourt), B.K. Benson (from Lagos), and Dandatti Abdulkadir, Dahiru Liman, and Dambazau (all from Kano), convened in Kano to discuss with him on the next steps to follow.

Aminu's supporters organised a large gathering, later named Taron Rami, meaning "meeting of the ditch." Attendees of this gathering concluded that Aminu had been insulted and disrespected by the NPN and its members, leading to the decision that he should establish his own political party. Speakers at the event included Dambazau, Usman Nagado, and Abubakar Rimi. Despite being ill and bedridden, Aminu dispatched delegates across the nation to engage with his supporters and allies to deliberate on the next course of action. Following positive responses, he formed a committee to lay the groundwork for the party. The People's Redemption Party (PRP) was inaugurated in Kaduna on 21 October 1978, attracting radical trade unionists, artisans, the peasantry, progressive lecturers, journalists, authors, and former NEPU members among its ranks. Notable early members of the party included influential figures nationwide, such as Sam Ikoku, Abubakar Rimi, Chinua Achebe, Wole Soyinka, Yusufu Bala Usman, Umaru Musa Yar'Adua, Sule Lamido, Ghali Umar Na'Abba, Sabo Bakin Zuwo, Michael Imoudu, and Edward Ikem Okeke. The launch in October reportedly drew an "unbelievable number of people from all walks of life."

==== 1979 Nigerian election ====
Elections were held between 7 July and 11 August in 1979. Only five parties were allowed to contest in these elections, apart from the NPN and PRP, the other three were Awolowo led Unity Party of Nigeria (UPN), Azikiwe led Nigerian People's Party (NPP), and the Great Nigeria People's Party (GNPP), led by Waziri Ibrahim, a former NPC politician. The election was the first held in 15 years and the first in Northern Nigeria that allowed women to participate.

Aminu was chosen as PRP's presidential candidate, however, he was refused clearance by FEDECO to contest due to tax irregularities, and was required to submit "more convincing evidence". Aminu denied liability for any tax other than the flat rate of tax imposed on all Nigerians irrespective of income. He was eventually cleared after a court declaration was released supporting Aminu's claim of not missing any tax payment.

Results of the 1979 Nigerian presidential election

It became increasingly apparent that the NPN was "on its way to power" as the elections progressed. After the party experienced widespread success during the National Assembly election, the participating parties began proposing and forming alliances. On 28 July, three out of the five parties — namely UPN, NPP, and GNPP — met in Lagos to form an alliance against the NPN. The PRP was invited to join this alliance but did not respond. A similar arrangement was proposed to the PRP by the NPN through Shehu Shagari, NPN's presidential candidate. In his autobiography, he claimed to have made this proposal while Aminu was still trying to get FEDECO to clear him. He tried to convince Aminu to withdraw from the presidential race "since we both knew his chances to be bleak". In return, the PRP could focus more on other elections and "participate in an NPN federal government". According to Shagari, Aminu agreed but on two conditions: he would consult his party members and seek approval, and also challenge FEDECO's decision in court in order to "defend his good name". Aminu was cleared on 1 August 1979, hours before the deadline for presidential nominations. He flew from Kano to Lagos on the same day to file his nomination papers with FEDECO. This led Shagari to conclude that the PRP did not endorse their agreement.

The presidential election held on 11 August saw Aminu winning only in his home state of Kano, where he garnered 76% of the votes. Nationwide, he received 1,732,113 votes, amounting to 10% of the total votes cast. The PRP framed the election as a class struggle in Kano and conducted an extensive propaganda campaign to promote this narrative, contributing to the party's significant success in the state. Additionally, the PRP secured victories in two gubernatorial elections: Abubakar Rimi in Kano (with 79% of the votes) and Balarabe Musa in Kaduna (with 45% of the votes). According to Shagari, Aminu was a skillful campaigner and "genuinely cared about people and empathized with them pretty well" but failed to be more successful nationwide because "his PRP lacked the large organizational base and resources necessary for an effective nationwide campaign".

On 16 August, FEDECO announced the results of the presidential election. Shagari was declared the winner with 5,688,857 votes nationwide.

===== Reactions =====
FEDECO's announcement was controversial, with Azikiwe, representing the four unsuccessful parties, rejecting "in its entirety and without any reservation the declaration of Alhaji Shehu Shagari as president-elect". Awolowo appealed to the Supreme Court, which dismissed the appeal.

After the declaration of Shagari as president-elect, the alliance between the opposing parties, which now included PRP, stregnthened, leading the ruling NPN to search for its own alliance. They approached the other four parties to initiate talks, which the PRP was the first to accept, according to Shagari. However, it was Azikiwe's NPP that ended up reaching an 'accord' with the ruling party. The terms of the accord were finalized by representatives of the two parties on 22 August, two days after Azikiwe's address rejecting Shagari's declaration. Meetings regarding the terms of the accord began on 20 August, the same day as the speech. According to historian Oyeleye Oyediran, one of the agreements made during the meetings concerned Aminu, outlining that "special arrangements were to be made for Alhaji Aminu Kano, leader of the PRP, were his party to join the alliance."

Over a year into Shagari's administration, the NPN-NPP accord broke down despite the allocation of key leadership positions to NPP members by the ruling party. The accord formally ended on 6 July 1981, after a joint agreement from the two parties.

==== The PRP split ====
Some months into the Second Republic, nine governors from UPN, GNPP, and PRP held monthly meetings where they held discussions and aired their grievances against Shagari's government. These governors were seen as the main political opposition to the ruling party. This caused tension within the PRP as the party's most influential leaders—its President Aminu and its National Secretary, S.G. Ikoku—emphasized cooperation with the NPN, while some more radical members, including the two governors, Abubakar Rimi and Balarabe Musa, who were both members of the nine Governors, denounced the NPN and opposed any form of cooperation.

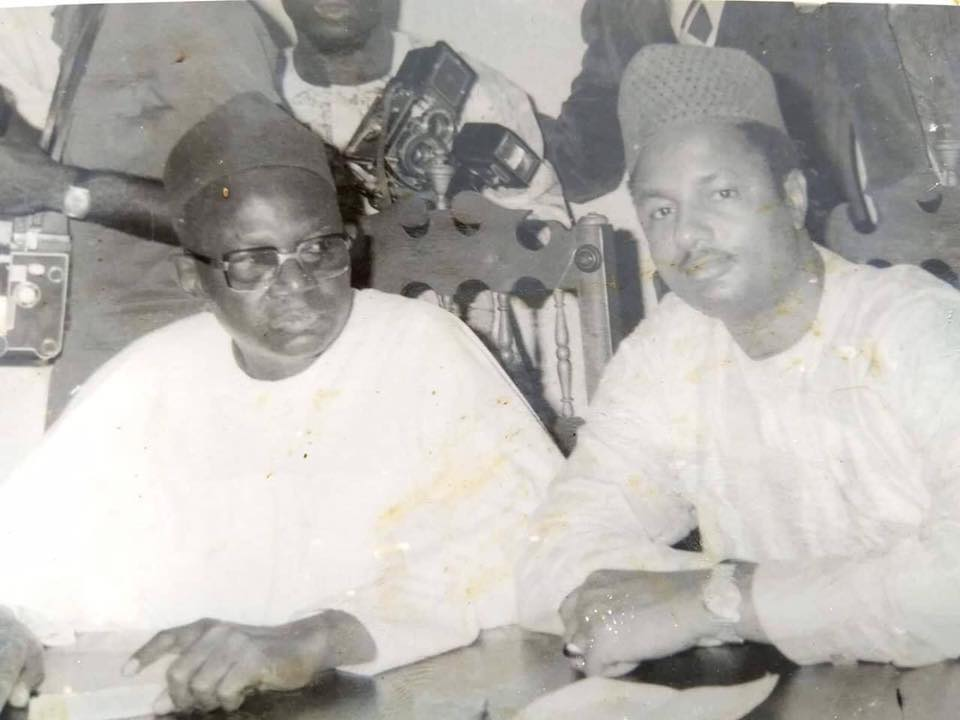
Aminu and Abubakar Rimi. Likely taken before the party split.

Two factions formed within the party. The 'radical' faction were more or less "deeply committed to radical change and socialist principles." They had the desire for an "open confrontation of class forces". It contained some of the founding members of the party, most of its House of Representatives members, its prominent intellectuals, and the two governors. While the other faction represented the more moderate and ideologically varied members of the party. They encouraged the more moderate 'democratic humanism' of Aminu Kano, and held the belief that confrontation with the Shagari government "should yield, at least for the time being, to the imperatives of national unity and inter-party co-operation." This group included prominent leftists—like Ikoku—businessmen, professionals, and other party members loyal to Aminu. The radical faction was called Santsi ('slippery' in Hausa) after Aminu said they were on a slippery slope. Rimi then replied that 'some party leaders' were 'stuck in the mud', hence the pro-Aminu faction were known as Taɓo ('mud' in Hausa).

During the spring of 1980, while Aminu was abroad for medical treatment, the PRP leadership formally prohibited the two governors from attending the nine governors' meetings. Upon his return, unable to mediate between the two factions, he aligned himself with the Taɓo faction, thereby endorsing the actions of the party establishment. As the two governors persisted in attending the meetings despite the directive, they were expelled from the party. In response, the Santsi faction, claiming to be the authentic PRP, convened a party convention in December 1980, where they expelled Aminu and Ikoku, replacing them with Chief Michael Imodu and Abubakar Rimi, respectively. However, despite the significant number of PRP legislators who sided with the Santsi faction, FEDECO recognized Aminu as the legitimate leader of the PRP.

==== 1981 Kano riot ====
On 7 July 1981, Governor Rimi issued a letter to the Emir of Kano, Ado Bayero, accusing him of deliberate disrespect toward the Kano State Government. The letter demanded a response within 48 hours to justify why disciplinary action should not be taken. The letter was described by the West Africa magazine as "most disrespectful...suitable for admonishing a clerk, but...most unsuitable for addressing a [venerated] traditional and religious leader". Other conservative religious and intellectual figures also condemned the letter, along with a spokesperson from the Taɓo faction. The NPN promptly capitalized on the situation, urging "people of goodwill" to "defend their traditional institutions".

Violence erupted on 10 July 1981, in Kano, resulting in the burning of several government buildings, including the State Government Secretariat, Radio Kano, and the State House of Assembly. The headquarters of the Santsi faction and the residences of key officials in Rimi's government were also targeted. Dr. Bala Mohammed Bauchi, Rimi's chief political adviser and a leading intellectual in the party, was killed in the fire. The West Africa magazine estimated the total damage from the riots at ₦100 million in its 20 July 1981 issue. The leaders of the Santsi faction accused the NPN and Aminu of orchestrating the riots to "preserve their political power".

==== Aftermath ====
The killing of Dr. Bala Mohammed deepened the division within the PRP. Earlier in the year, Balarabe Musa, the PRP Governor of Kaduna, was impeached by the NPN-dominated State House of Assembly. In 1982, he released a book titled Struggle for Social and Economic Change, in which he accused Aminu of orchestrating the 1981 killings. Musa further asserted that despite "all his rhetoric, fables, gestures, and tricks, Mallam Aminu Kano failed to get our government and the bulk of the party to betray our General Programme."

Following the expulsion of several influential members from the PRP, the Santsi faction fragmented, due to issues like electoralism, a crisis of survival, and strategic conflicts. Abubakar Rimi joined Azikiwe's NPP, while Balarabe Musa attempted to reconcile with Aminu. Musa disclosed in a 2012 interview that Aminu's illness during this period left him "largely unaware of his surroundings," which was exploited by "some evil people around him." Musa also mentioned Aminu's intention to organise a reconciliation gathering at his house, but his deteriorating health prevented it, leading to his eventual passing.

In preparation for the 1983 presidential election, Aminu chose Bola Ogunbo as his running mate, the first time a woman ever held the position in the country. However, he died on 17 April 1983, several months before the election.

== Death ==
After suffering from a stroke as a result of a bout of cerebral malaria, Aminu Kano died on 17 April 1983 in his home in Kano. He was buried on the same day in his house. Since 2001, a commemorative lecture is held every year on the anniversary of his death at Mambayya House.

== Legacy ==
Nigeria cannot be the same again because Aminu Kano lived here.

— Chinua Achebe, An Image of Africa / The Trouble with Nigeria

Aminu's influence continues to resonate in Nigerian politics long after his death. Many of his followers from his days in the PRP went on to become prominent figures in Nigerian politics, particularly during the Fourth Republic (1999—present). Notable among these politicians are Sule Lamido, who served as the Governor of Jigawa from 2007 to 2015 and, in honour of Aminu, built the Mallam Aminu Kano Triangle in Dutse; Ghali Umar Na'Abba, who held the position of Speaker of the Federal House of Representatives from 1999 to 2003; and most prominently, Umaru Musa Yar'Adua, who served as Nigeria's president from 2007 until his passing on 5 May 2010.

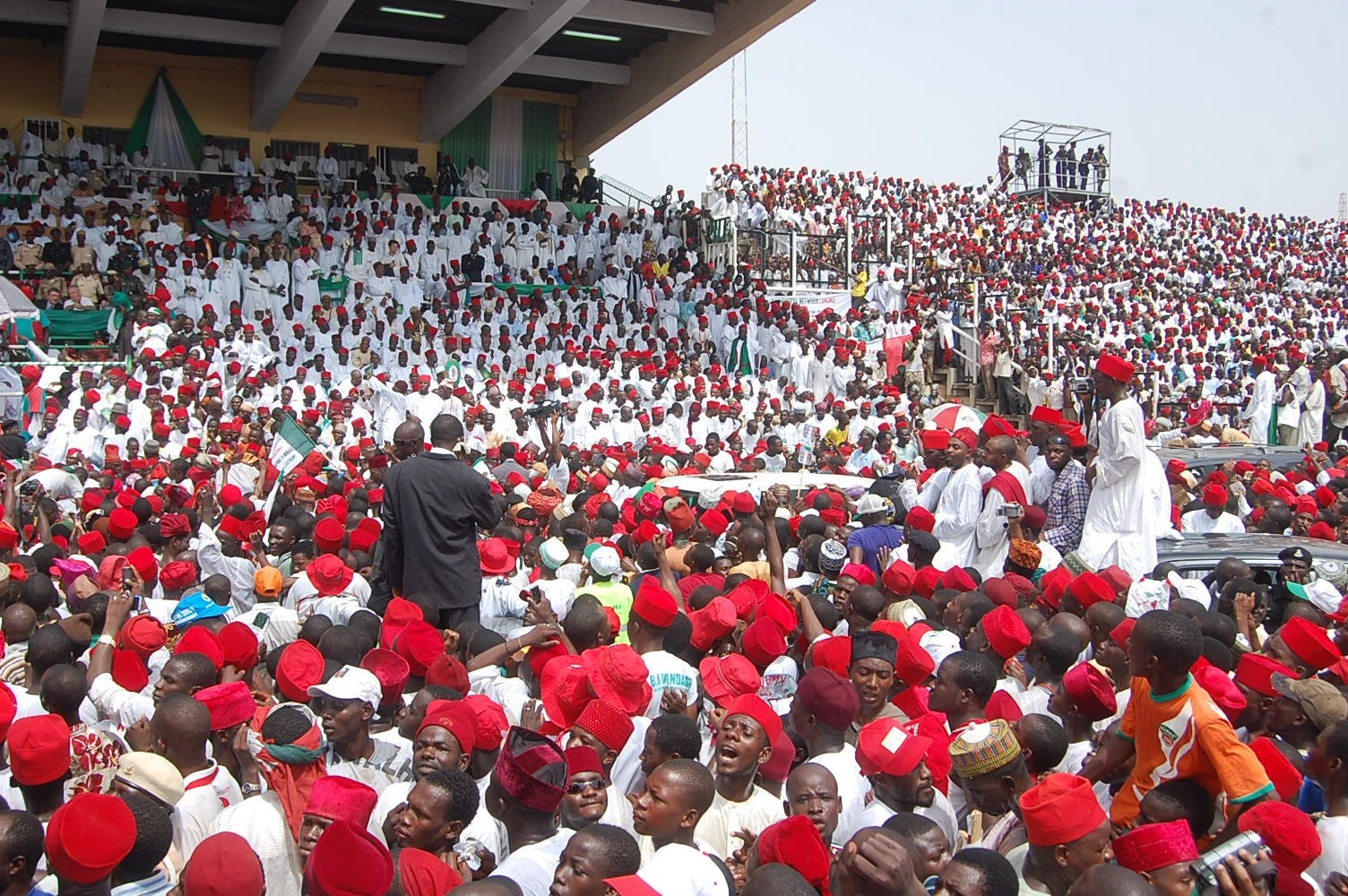
Taken in Kano during the inauguration of Kwankwaso as Governor of Kano in 2011, this image shows his followers, known as the Kwankwasiyya. They adorn the red cap, white cloth, and black shoes, inspired by Aminu's signature look, which was later adopted by Kwankwaso.

Perhaps the strongest sign of Aminu's ongoing influence on Nigerian politics can be seen in his home state of Kano. Politicians seeking the support of the talakawa often lay claim to being the 'successors of Aminu Kano,' with former Governor of Kano State and presidential aspirant Rabiu Kwankwaso being a notable example.

=== Hausa cinema and plays ===
As a young boy, Aminu often composed plays which he used to act out "his complaints, criticisms, and aspirations in dramatic form". In these plays, he regularly reserved the leading role to himself and gave out the other parts to his playmates. Later as a student at Kano Middle School, he became the first to formally write drama works in the Hausa-language. While studying at the Kaduna College, he founded the Dramatic Society and wrote several plays in which he:

...criticized the exploitation of the masses and challenged the system of emirates in northern Nigeria. In the play, Kai wane ne a kasuwar Kano da ba za a cuce ka ba? ('Whoever you might be, you will be cheated at Kano market') he depicted the exploitation of country people by heartless merchants, while in Karya Fure take ba ta ‘ya’ya ('A lie blooms but yields no fruit') he raised the problem of excessive taxes levied upon the Hausa rural population. In the years 1939—1941 Aminu Kano wrote around twenty short plays for the use of schools in which he ridiculed some of the outdated local customs as well as the activities of the Native Authority in the system of indirect colonial administration.

In 1940, during the second annual general meeting of the Kaduna Old Boys Association (now Barewa Old Boys Association), a meeting where the alumni of the college "meet and have free discussions among themselves", Aminu, at the time still a student, staged his Kai wane ne a kasuwar Kano play for the KOBA attendees. According to Abubakar Imam, who was among the attendees, 'observers' viewed the play as "politically inspired, capable of doing more harm than good to the stability of the region, and more especially with a global war on". This led to the school's authorities refusing to host any future meetings and to associate with KOBA.

Aminu drew inspiration from notable writers such as Shakespeare, Rousseau, Voltaire, and Tom Paine, attempting to adapt their works for a Hausa audience. He often served as the playwright, actor, and director in his plays, sometimes converting prose into drama or using strictly original material. He and his colleagues constructed stages, inviting audiences to witness their shows, often during festivals like Sallah. These performances gained popularity, sometimes drawing the attendance of even the emir and district heads. Aminu made social commentary and criticisms through these plays and shows. One notable play, initially titled Kar Ka Bata Hajin Naka ('Don't Spoil Your Hajj'), later renamed Alhaji Ka Iya Kwanga ('Alhaji, You Know How to Dance the Conga'), cautioned Nigerians against being captivated by the superficial allure of Western ways, emphasizing that imitation was destined to fail. Instead, he advocated for change through education in their own customs.

Although he sent several of his plays to Gaskiya Ta Fi Kwabo, the government-run Hausa-language newspaper, none were accepted. According to Abdalla Uba Adamu, 'The traditional establishment was too entrenched to accept literary criticism, especially from one of them.' Nevertheless, Aminu Kano's plays were influential in Hausa cinema, with several of his plays adapted to film. He was particularly influential on Maitama Sule, one of Hausa cinema's early adopters. Sule mentioned attending Kaduna College after Aminu had graduated, recalling that almost all the plays he acted in were written by Aminu. He added that he remembered an occasion where:

...students swarmed to the railroad station to greet Aminu when they heard that he was enroute from Kano to Bauchi and would stop for a short time in Kaduna. The train was delayed for several hours, so they all trooped over to the field to perform a play of his on which they had been working. Aminu, when he arrived, joined the cast...

Sule played a pivotal role in founding one of Northern Nigeria's first film production companies, the Maitama Sule Drama Group. His social and political critiques are often reflected in Nigerian films, particularly those in the Hausa language.

=== Reformist ideas ===
Aminu Kano joined the Northern Elements Progressive Union as a political platform to challenge what he felt was the autocratic and feudalistic actions of the Native Northern Government. He geared his attack on the ruling elite including the emirs, who were mostly Fulanis. The potency of his platform was strengthened partly because of his background. His father was an acting Alkali in Kano who came from a lineage of Islamic clerics, Aminu Kano also brought up Islamic ideas on equity in his campaign trails during the first republic. Many talakawas (commoners) in Kano lined up behind his message and his political stature grew from the support of the Kano commoners and migratory petty traders in the north. Many of the tradesmen later manned the offices of NEPU. He also sought to use politics to create an egalitarian Northern Nigerian society.

Another major idea of his in the prelude to the first republic was the breakup of ethnically based parties. The idea was well received by his emerging support base of petty traders and craftsmen in towns along the rail track. The men and women were mostly migratory individuals searching for trade opportunities and had little ethnic similarities with their host communities. He also proposed a fiscal system that favors heavy taxation of the rich in the region and was notably one of the few leading Nigerian politicians that supported equal rights for women.

Mallam Aminu Kano is highly respected politician in Northern Nigeria. He symbolized democratization, women's empowerment and freedom of speech. An airport, a college and also a major street are also named after him in Kano. His house where he lived and died and buried has been converted to Centre for Democratic Research and Training under the Bayero University Kano.

=== Women's empowerment ===
Aminu's deep concern for his mother and the societal constraints she faced led him to make women's empowerment a lifelong dedication. He refrained from having multiple wives, asserting that the Qur'an permitted a Muslim to marry up to four wives only if equal treatment was ensured, which he thought was impossible to achieve. He interpreted this as the Qur'an not advocating polygamy. A strong believer in education as a means of women's emancipation, he sponsored a school for women which convened at his home from 1952 until his death in 1983, offering courses in handicrafts, sewing, Hausa, and basic English literacy. During his two-year course at the Institute of Education, he wrote all his term papers on "The Problem of Girls' Education in Kano".

Throughout his political career, Aminu consistently challenged the exclusion of women from public life and formal political processes. He evoked Islamic concepts of "freedom," "jihad," and "justice" to advocate for women's empowerment, positioning it as a fundamental concern within his political party. Alongside his cousin Isa Wali, he championed this cause in the 1950s and 1960s, a stance that was relatively rare during that period. During the 1970s and 1980s, with the return to democracy in Nigeria, the People's Redemption Party (PRP), under his leadership, emerged as the only political party in Nigeria addressing this issue, and Aminu became closely associated with advocating for women's rights more than any other politician in the country. He argued that the Qur'an gave Muslims the right to "have a direct say in the affairs of the state or a representative chosen by him or her".

Had he participated in the 1983 Presidential election, his running mate would have been Mrs. Bola Ogunbo, which would have been the first time a Nigerian woman was nominated for high national office. He advocated for the greater involvement of women in public affairs, implementing large-scale education programs for women through his party PRP and appointed several women to public positions. In both the parties he led, the Northern Elements Progressive Union (NEPU) from 1953 to 1966 and the PRP from 1978 to 1983, women were encouraged to engage politically. However, while these parties established women's wings and addressed issues concerning education and voting rights, they often stifled female members' attempts to independently confront wider issues. The women's wings, though present, did not lead reformative or revolutionary changes for women.

=== Islamiyya schools ===
During the 1950s, drawing inspiration from Islamic schools in Sudan, the writings of Abdullahi dan Fodio, and some similar reformist movements in Nigeria, Aminu initiated the establishment of the first Islamiyya schools, aiming to reform and modernise Islamic education in Kano. To garner support, Aminu proposed the programme to influential mallamai in Kano, including Sheikh Na’ibi Suleiman Wali and Inuwa Wada. The first of these schools was established in the Sudawa ward of the city, which quickly rose in popularity with an initial enrollment of 30 students that soon grew to 60. Parents, especially those with young girls, favoured these schools as they focused on Islamic education while also incorporating aspects of Western education which was a viable alternative to not attending school at all.

An education officer inspected the schools and was impressed with the program, leading to its integration into the formal school system. Within a year, ten more Islamiyya schools were opened in major cities across Northern Nigeria, including Kano, Kaduna, and Jos. By 1958, there were approximately 60 such schools. Given that most support for these schools came from NEPU members, they became politicised and were occasionally targeted, even violently. Nevertheless, the popularity of these schools endured, particularly among female students.

Following Nigeria's independence in 1960, the Northern Government increased its support for Islamiyya schools. By the 1970s, primary school students "in addition to their primary studies attend an Islamiyya school fo several hours a day". Today, the majority of children in Northern Nigeria attend Islamiyya schools alongside traditional primary education. These schools have received support from the Nigerian government and international organizations, such as USAID, as part of efforts to promote goals like girls' education.

== Personal life ==
=== Family ===
Aminu's first wife, Umma, was a divorcee from another marriage. Her family was 'royalty of sorts' and disapproved of her marriage to Aminu due to his 'open anti-royalty stance.' The marriage took place in Kano in 1939; however, they dissolved it once Aminu left for Kaduna College. Umma, who was against the dissolution, fled to Kaduna and remarried Aminu. Her family managed to convince the local Alkali to dissolve the marriage a second time after the couple returned to Kano for holidays. Shortly after her year-long relationship with Aminu ended, Umma fled to Ghana alone.

Aminu's second wife was Hasia, who comes from a royal family in Bauchi. Her grandmother approached Aminu's father on her behalf, and he accepted the proposal. Aminu learned of this while concluding his studies at Kaduna College and returned to Kano shortly after. Following this, he and Hasia relocated to Bauchi for his teaching assignment. At the time of their marriage, Hasia was young and lacked formal schooling. Aminu took it upon himself to educate her in the Quran, basic English literacy (reading, writing, and arithmetic), and personal hygiene. She also shared her knowledge by tutoring other women around her. During their marriage, Hasia suffered from a spleen infection, which hindered her ability to bear children. In 1948, she conceived but later miscarried. Once Aminu retired from teaching in 1950 and took up politics, they moved to Kano. His political engagements left little time for Hasia, who felt isolated. She resided in Aminu's family compound in Sudawa but later returned to her mother's home after a dispute with Aminu's stepmother. Refusing to return, their marriage ended. Aminu arranged for Hasia to work in a maternity hospital, a position she held until at least the early 1970s. Despite the end of their marriage, Aminu and Hasia remained on good terms. She attended his wedding in 1969 and, a year later, he sponsored her pilgrimage to Mecca.

=== Personality ===
Chinua Achebe, the influential Nigerian novelist and PRP colleague of Aminu, described him as "a saint and revolutionary". He further added that:

...if Aminu Kano should discover that he had joined the ranks of the oppressor he would promptly and openly renounce his position and wage war on himself!

British journalist and historian Basil Davidson, who Aminu described as his friend, characterized Aminu as "the Teacher, the Rebel, the Crusader-Politician, and the Statesman-Parliamentarian". Adding to Davidson's description, Aminu described himself during a speech at the Bayero University's Convocation Ceremony in 1982 as "a democratic humanist committed to elevating humanity and upholding the dignity of women". Elspeth Huxley, British writer who met Aminu in the early 1950s, in her 1954 book "Four Guineas: A Journey Through West Africa", described Aminu as "a Cassius of a man, slight and fiery, fluent in English, his heart a scorpion and his tongue a whip". She further described him as "a demagogue—ready-tongued, fanatical".

Aminu was well known for his frugal lifestyle. Despite his ministerial position under Gowon, he primarily sustained himself through his "small farm holding" and occasional gifts from his friends.

Aminu's knowledge of Islam earned him the title of Mallam (a title reserved for learned men in Northern Nigeria). He was an expert in Islamic jurisprudence and tafsir, delivering widely popular lectures on these subjects, especially in Kano. His Qur'anic interpretations mainly focused on the Islamic principles of justice, the significance of education within Islam, and advocated for tolerance among the 'people of the book'—comprising Muslims, Christians, and Jews.

== See also ==
- Northern Elements Progressive Union
- People's Redemption Party
- Sa'adu Zungur
- Sawaba Declaration
