= 1979 Kaduna State gubernatorial election =

1979 gubernatorial election in Kaduna State, Nigeria

- July 28, 1979
Nominee	Abdulkadir Balarabe Musa	Lawal Kaita
Party	PRP	NPN
Running mate	Abba Musa Rimi
Popular vote	560,252	551,252
Percentage	45.14%	44.42%
Governor before election
Ibrahim Mahmud Alfa
Nigerian military junta
Elected Governor
Abdulkadir Balarabe Musa
PRP

The 1979 Kaduna State gubernatorial election occurred on July 28, 1979. PRP's Abdulkadir Balarabe Musa won election for a first term to become Kaduna State's first executive governor leading by 45.14%, defeating NPN's Lawal Kaita who got 44.42% and the GNPP candidate with 10.44%, in the contest.

Abdulkadir Balarabe Musa emerged the PRP flag bearer in the primary election. His running mate was Abba Musa Rimi.

== Electoral system ==
The Governor of Kaduna State is elected using the plurality voting system.

== Results ==
Three of the five political parties registered by the Federal Electoral Commission (FEDECO) participated in the election. Abdulkadir Balarabe Musa of the PRP won the contest by polling 45.14% of the votes, and was closely followed NPN's candidate, Lawal Kaita. There were 3,420,839 registered electorates. The total votes cast was 1,241,437.

Candidate	Party	Votes	%
Abdulkadir Balarabe Musa	People's Redemption Party (PRP)	560,252	45.14
National Party of Nigeria (NPN)	551,252	44.42	
Great Nigeria People's Party (GNPP)	129,580	10.44	
Unity Party of Nigeria (UPN)			
Nigerian People's Party (NPP)			
Total		1,241,084	100.00
Registered voters/turnout		3,420,839	–
Source: Africa Spectrum, JILI
