= S.G. Ikoku =

Samuel Goomsu Ikoku
- Also known as: S.G.Ikoku
- Born: Calabar
- Occupations: A Nigerian trade unionist and a politician.

Mazi Samuel Goomsu Ikoku was a Nigerian trade unionist and politician. As a student at University of Southampton, Ikoku supported Nigeria's independence movement, writing articles printed by the West African Pilot. After his degree, he joined the radical arm of the independence movement, working as an adviser to the Nigerian Federation of Labour led Michael Imoudu and later co-founding the United Working People's Party in 1952. A year later, the party was officially disbanded, the government did so after branding the organization as subversive and communist. Ikoku later began a relationship with the Action Group (AG) that span majority of the First Republic.

Ikoku sometimes spoke on national issues with a sense of candor, this style led to him being called a controversial figure by former Science and Technology Minister, Sam Momah.

== Life ==
Born to Alvan Ikoku from Arochuku and Grace Ikoku from Calabar. Ikoku graduated from Achimota College and later studied at University College, Southampton. Beginning in 1946, Ikoku took interest in the independence movement led by Nnamdi Azikiwe. He began writing articles in Azikiwe's West African Pilot criticizing the Legislative Council, in which his father was a nominated member, arguing against the council as an imposed government and aligning with Azikiwe's ideas about immediate independence. Whilst studying in Southampton, he met his future spouse Eileen Sandwell. He returned to Nigeria in 1949 and joined the civil service, during this time, he took up advisory roles with trade unions in the country. He left government work in 1951, to dedicate his time to work for the Nigerian Federation of Labour which was seeking affiliation with the World Federation of Trade Unions. Ikoku also joined a group of young socialist to form a short lived political organization, the United Working People's Party, independent of prominent individuals. During this time, he began publishing a journal with editorials supporting Stalinist ideas. Both the journal and the paper were disbanded by colonial authorities.

In the 1950s, Ikoku joined one of the mainstream parties when he became a member of Action Group which then had a strong organizational structure. Ikoku was immediately given the position of organizing secretary. In 1957, he won regional House of Assembly election, in the assembly he represented AG and served as the leader of opposition. During the campaigns preceding the election, Ikoku's father was contesting the same seat under the United National Independent Party.

Ikoku was a member of the Action Group's socialist faction. This faction was to focus on ideology as a political campaign tool and a believe in imperialism as a pressing danger. in 1960, the party adopted democratic socialism as an Ideology but the party's national executive and the Western regional premier leaned towards capitalism.

In 1962, he traveled to Ghana, days before factional crisis engulfed the Western Region House of Assembly leading to a state of emergency. Some factional members of the Action Group were later charged for treason. In Ghana, Ikoku organized a branch of the party and also worked as a lecturer at Nkrumah's Ideological Institute and as an editor for the Spark magazine, published in Ghana.

During the Nigerian Civil War, Ikoku did not support secession. He was briefly detained after his return from Ghana but was later appointed commissioner for Economic Development and later Health in the East Central State.

Ikoku broke ranks with former Action Group members and joined Aminu Kano's People's Redemption Party during the Second Republic. He was appointed Secretary-General of the party, which believed in the emancipation of the talakawa. He was Aminu Kano's running mate in 1979 presidential election which was won by Shehu Shagari. However, beginning during the twilight of the republic, Ikoku began to shift away from his socialist ideas. He left PRP and became an adviser to Shehu Shagari of the National Party of Nigeria.

He spoke of elongating the role of the military in Nigeria's political affairs during the administration of Ibrahim Babangida and later served as deputy chairman of the Transition Implementation Committee during Sani Abacha's regime. As the deputy chairman, Ikoku argued that Abacha was free to succeed himself if the political parties agree to draft him as their presidential candidate.

He died in 1997. Ikoku was step-father of Patti Boulaye.
