= Abubakar Maigari Umar =

Nigerian politician

Abubakar Maigari Umar is a Nigerian politician born in 1980 in Bauchi State, who represented Bauchi in the Azare (Zaki II) constituency of the House of Assembly in 2023. He was a member of the People's Redemption Party (PRP).
