= Sawaba Declaration =

The Northern Elements Progressive Union Declaration of Principles, referred to as the Sawaba Declaration, was a political manifesto for the Northern Elements Progressive Union (NEPU).

On 8 August 1950, a group of radicals from Northern Nigeria, who were former members of the cultural association that would soon become the political party Northern People's Congress (NPC), issued the Sawaba Declaration in Kano. This Declaration of Principles led to the founding of the Northern Elements Progressive Union, a socialist party that spearheaded the movement opposing the conservative NPC until the dissolution of all political parties at the end of Nigeria's First Republic.

Although NEPU was dissolved in 1966, the Sawaba Declaration regained influence during the Second Republic with the founding of the People's Redemption Party (PRP), a political party established by left-leaning intellectuals, including former NEPU members. The PRP adopted these principles as part of its General Programme.

== Text ==
The Northern Elements Progressive Union holds:

1. That the shocking state of social order as at present existing in Northern Nigeria is due to nothing but the Family Compact rule of the so-called Native Administration in their present autocratic form.
2. That owing to this unscrupulous and vicious system of administration by the Family Compact rulers and which has been established and fully supported by the British Imperialist Government, there is today in our Society an antagonism of interest, manifesting itself as a class struggle, between the members of that vicious circle of Native Administration on the one hand and the ordinary 'Talakawa' on the other.
3. That this antagonism can be abolished only by the emancipation of the Talakawa from the domination of these privileged few by the reform of the present autocratic political Institutions into Democratic Institutions and placing their democratic control in the hands of the Talakawa for whom alone they exist.
4. That this emancipation must be the work of the Talakawa themselves.
5. That as at present, the Machinery of Government, including the armed forces of the nation exist only to conserve the privilege of this selfish minority group, the Talakawa must organize consciously and politically for the conquest of the powers of Government—both nationally and locally—in order that this machinery of Government, including these forces, may be converted from an instrument of oppression into the agent of emancipation, and the overthrow of Bureaucracy and autocratic privilege.
6. That all political parties are but the expression of class interest, and as the interest of the Talakawa is diametrically opposed to the interest of all sections of the master class both white and black, the party seeking the emancipation of the Talakawa must naturally be hostile to the party of the oppressors.
7. The Northern Elements Progressive Union of Northern Nigeria, therefore, being the only political party of the Talakawa, enters the field of political action determined to reduce to nonentity any party of hypocrites and traitors to our mother country, and calls upon all the sons and daughters of Northern Nigeria to muster under its banner to the end, that a speedy termination may be wrought to this vicious system of administration which deprives them of the fruits of their labour, and that POVERTY may give place to COMFORT, PRIVILEGE TO EQUALITY, and political, economic, and social SLAVERY to FREEDOM.
