= 1979 Kano State gubernatorial election =

1979 gubernatorial election in Kano State, Nigeria

- July 28, 1979
Nominee	Abubakar Rimi
Party	PRP
Running mate	Ibrahim B.B Farouk
Elected Governor
Abubakar Rimi
PRP

The 1979 Kano State gubernatorial election took place on July 28, 1979. People's Redemption Party (PRP) candidate Abubakar Rimi won the election.

Abubakar Rimi was elected the PRP Deputy National Secretary in December 1978 at Lagos. He became the gubernatorial candidate of the party on June 25, 1979.
