= Abba Musa Rimi =

Nigerian politician (born 1940)

Abba Musa Rimi CON

Governor of Kaduna State
- In office 23 June 1981 – 1 October 1983
- Preceded by: Abdulkadir Balarabe Musa
- Succeeded by: Lawal Kaita

Deputy Governor of Kaduna State
- In office 1 October 1979 – 23 June 1981
- Governor: Abdulkadir Balarabe Musa

Personal details
- Born: 28 February 1940 (age 86) Rimi, Northern Region, British Nigeria (now in Katsina State, Nigeria)
- Party: People's Redemption Party (1979–1983)
- Spouse: Aishatu Uwani Rimi
- Children: 7, including Nura
- Occupation: Politician

Abba Musa Rimi CON (born 28 February 1940) is a Nigerian politician who served as the governor of Kaduna State from 1981 to 1983 following the impeachment of Governor Abdulkadir Balarabe Musa in the Nigerian Second Republic. He previously served as deputy governor under Musa from October 1979 to June 1981.

== Early life and career ==
Abba Musa Rimi was born on 28 February 1940 in Rimi present-day Katsina State, Nigeria.

He worked in sales and marketing for various multinational companies such as UAC, NTC and G.B. OLLIVANT. He later became a director of African Circle Pollution Management.

Rimi opened IBBI Nigeria, now a leading brewery in Northern Nigeria, on 27 March 1982.

== Political career ==
In February 1982, Pope John Paul II visited Kaduna. Although squabbling Muslim religious leaders failed to show up. While at the airport, the Pope read an address to Rimi and other government officials urging cooperation and unity among Christians and Muslims before flying on to Lagos.

In August 1982, Rimi was forced to appeal to the Jama'atul Nasril Islam (JNI) to find a way to end violent clashes between the Izala and Darika Muslim groups.

After General Muhammadu Buhari seized power in a coup on 31 December 1983, he arrested most of the former governors. On 28 March 1985, a Special Military Tribunal sentenced Rimi to 21 years in jail for corruptly enriching 96 legislators of the State House of Assembly with N500,000. Rimi said he had given the money to the legislators "for keeping the law and order in their constituencies".

In October 1998, Rimi became the special advisor on political affairs to the military head of state General Abdulsalam Abubakar during the transition to civilian rule.

== Personal life ==
Rimi is a holder of the national award of Commander of the Order of the Niger (CON). He is married to Aishatu Rimi and has seven children.
