= 1954 Nigerian general election =

General elections were held in Nigeria between October and December 1954. The Northern People's Congress emerged as the largest party, winning 84 of the 184 seats. However, the NPC only won seats in the Northern Region. Although the National Council of Nigeria and the Cameroons won the most seats in the Eastern and Western Regions, Action Group was the only party to win seats in all three regions.

== Electoral system ==
The elections were held using different systems in the different provinces. Direct elections were held in Lagos and the Eastern and Western regions, whilst electoral colleges were used in Southern Cameroons and Northern Region.

Half of the 184 seats were allocated to the Northern Region, 42 to each of the Eastern and Western region, six to Southern Cameroons and two to Lagos.

== Results ==
Party	Seats
Northern People's Congress	84
National Council of Nigeria and the Cameroons	63
Action Group	20
Kamerun National Congress	6
United National Independence Party	5
Idoma State Union	2
Middle Belt People's Party	2
Igbirra Tribal Union	1
Nigerian Commoners' Liberal Party	1
Total	184
Source: Azikiwe
