= Aminu Kano Centre for Democratic Studies =

Research and training unit of Bayero University Kano, Nigeria

- Abbreviation: AKCDS
- Nickname: Mambayya House
- Named after: Aminu Kano
- Formation: November 2000; 25 years ago
- Type: Nonprofit
- Purpose: Research and training
- Location: Kano, Kano State, Nigeria
- Coordinates: 12°0′54.342″N 8°30′20.4912″E
- Board Chairmain: Hafiz Abubakar
- Director: Habu Mohammed
- Parent organization: Bayero University Kano
- Website: mambayyahouse.ng

The Aminu Kano Centre for Democratic Studies (AKCDS), also known as Mambayya House, functions as a research and training unit of Bayero University, Kano. Established in 2000, the nonprofit organisation aims to "promote and consolidate Nigeria’s growing democratic heritage and practice through theoretical and applied research, as well as training and policy analysis".

Named in honour of the 20th-century Nigerian politician Aminu Kano, the Centre houses a museum commemorating his life, situated within the premises of the late politician's original residence. The centre's nickname, Mambayya House, originates from the nickname of Aminu's mother.

== History ==
After the Centre for Democratic Studies (CDS) was discontinued by the Federal Government of Nigeria in 1996, the vacated premises was donated to the Bayero University, Kano in 1999. The Aminu Kano Centre for Democratic Studies was founded a year later in November 2000.

== Programs and events ==
The AKCDS serves as a venue for hosting and coordinating a variety of events such as workshops, town hall meetings, seminars, and conferences. It occasionally invites prominent individuals to participate in these gatherings and programs. It collaborates with several national and international organisations, including government agencies, state governments, universities, and other organisations.

== Leadership ==
The governing board of the centre is chaired by Professor Hafiz Abubakar, former deputy governor of Kano State and former Deputy Vice-Chancellor, Bayero University, Kano. The Director of the AKCDS is Professor Habu Mohammed.
