= 1956–57 Nigerian regional elections =

Regional elections were held in Nigeria in 1956 and 1957. Members of the Western Region Legislative Assembly were elected on 26 May 1956, in eighty districts using the single-member plurality system. Members of the Eastern Region Legislative Assembly were elected on 15 March 1957, in twenty-seven districts using the multiple non-transferable vote.

== Results ==
=== Eastern Region ===
Party	Votes	%	Seats
National Council of Nigeria and the Cameroons	2,025,174	63.26	65
Action Group	344,153	10.75	13
United National Independence Party	202,478	6.32	5
Other parties	629,652	19.67	1
Total	3,201,457	100.00	84
Source: Sternberger et al., Mackenzie et al.

=== Northern Region ===
Party	Seats
Northern People's Congress	100
Other parties	21
Total	121
Source: Sternberger et al., Mackenzie et al.

=== Western Region ===
Party	Votes	%	Seats
Action Group	623,826	48.31	48
National Council of Nigeria and the Cameroons	584,556	45.27	32
Other parties	82,792	6.41	0
Total	1,291,174	100.00	80
Source: Sternberger et al., Mackenzie et al.
