= Aliyu Makama =

Nigerian politician (1905–1980)

Aliyu Mahmud Makama MHA, CMG, CFR, OBE
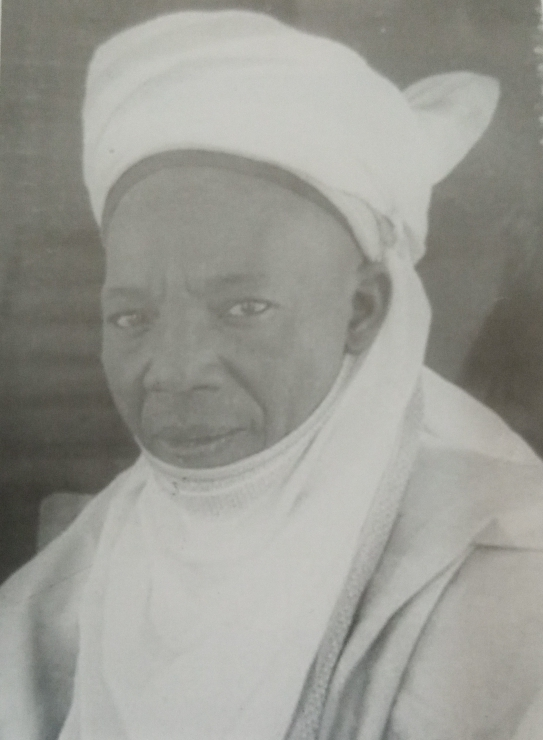
- Born: c. 1905; Bida, Nigeria
- Died: c. 1980 (aged 74–75); Kaduna, Nigeria
- Occupations: Teacher, headmaster, politician
- Political party: Northern People's Congress

Aliyu Makama Bida (1905–1980), MHA, CMG, CFR, OBE, CBE, was a Nigerian politician. He was the first Northern Minister of Education and Social Welfare, and later Minister of Finance and Treasurer of the NPC.

== Early life ==
Aliyu Makama Bida was born in 1905 in Bida, Niger State. His father was a respected Qur'anic scholar in the Court of the Nobility. His admission into an elementary school was through the influence of his father.

Typically for the Northern region, Aliyu started his early education in Quranic School in Bida, before registering in the provisional Elementary school of Bida town. Less usually, he did not end his education at that level. He went on to Katsina College, where he met majority of the Co-Northerners. They were to take charge and responsibility in shaping the political, economic and social fortunes of the North and lead the region to self-government.

== Career ==
After completing his secondary education at Katsina College in 1927, Aliyu was employed to teach in Niger Middle School. He later became a headmaster. In 1942, he was employed by the Bida Native Authority (N.A) as a Councillor in charge of District Administration of education.

Aliyu climbed the career ladder when he went for a course in Local Government in the United Kingdom around 1945. Later, he was a member of the African Conference. In 1952, he returned to the United Kingdom for the Cambridge Conference on Education. He was among the select few who attended the 1953 Constitutional talks, with some top Northerners from Nigerian society, in the United Kingdom.

While he was serving in traditional Council of the Etsu Nupe, Aliyu Mahmud as he was well known was honoured with the traditional title of Makama Nupe. In 1955, Aliyu performed the first pilgrimage to Mecca in the company of Sir Ahmadu Bello, Sardauna Sokoto and other Ministers.

A year before that pilgrimage, the Colonial Administration of Sherwood Smith administration appointed Aliyu as the Northern Region's First Minister of Education and Social Welfare in 1952.

== Political career ==
From teacher to headmaster, to N.A. Councillor and a Senior Minister with a responsible portfolio in Education, Aliyu Makama became a titan in the affairs of the North and as a member of Northern Peoples Congress (NPC). He rose to the position of Party Treasurer and took charge of the financial aspects of the NPC. He held the position throughout the existence of the Party. Though he is older than Sardauna of Sokoto, he was generally regarded as one of the closest allies and confidants to Sardauna. It was all due to the ultimate show of trust by the Sardauna of Sokoto to Aliyu Makama Bida. Aliyu frequently acted as Premier of Northern Nigeria any time the Premier travelled outside and the appointment was by Sardauna himself. Aliyu also served as the Northern Minister of Finance throughout the life span of their government.

Aliyu Makama Nupe was also a member of the Civil Defence before he became Sector Commander for Niger. He was Chairman Jama’atu Nasrul Islam. The tough, dogged and trustworthy politician was also an athlete in his school days. He left an unbroken record of 30 years in 100 yards sprint. The elder statesman died in 1980 as the first Patron of then ruling National Party of Nigeria (NPN); a party considered as an offshoot of the Northern People Congress (NPC). Aliyu Mahmud Makama Bida was honoured with officer of Order of British Empire, (OBE) before he died.

== Death ==
Alhaji Aliyu Makama died in 1980 of unknown causes.
