= Lawal Kaita =

Nigerian politician (1932–2018)

Governor of Kaduna State
- In office October 1983 – December 1983
- Preceded by: Abba Musa Rimi
- Succeeded by: Usman Mu'azu

Personal details
- Born: 4 October 1932 Katsina, Nigeria
- Died: 2 January 2018 (aged 85) Abuja, Nigeria
- Education: • Barewa College • London School of Economics

Lawal Kaita (4 October 1932 – 2 January 2018) was a Nigerian politician elected on the National Party of Nigeria (NPN) platform as governor of Kaduna State, Nigeria, holding office between October and December 1983, when the Nigerian Second Republic ended with the coup that brought General Muhammadu Buhari to power.

He continued to be an influential politician in the Nigerian Fourth Republic and was one of the founders of the Action Congress of Nigeria (AC) party in September 2006. Some sources have attributed the following quote to him prior to the 2011 presidential election: "The North is determined if it happens, to make Nigeria 'ungovernable' for President Jonathan or any other Southerner who finds his way to the seat of power on the platform of the PDP against the principle of the party's zoning policy.

== Early life and education ==
Kaita was born on 4 October 1932 in Katsina, in the far north of Nigeria. He is a blood relative of President Umaru Musa Yar'Adua and a member of the royal family of Nagogo, traditional rulers of the Emirate of Katsina.

He attended Barewa College, Zaria (1946–1950) and later studied at the London School of Economics (1971–1972).

== Career ==
After returning to Nigeria, Kaita joined the Kaduna State civil service. He served as Secretary to the State Water Board (1973–1975), Commissioner for Economic Planning (1975–1976) and Deputy Permanent Secretary of the Ministry of Works of Kaduna State (1976–1977).

=== Early political career ===
Kaita was appointed a Member of the Constituent Assembly of Nigeria (1977–1978) and became Special Assistant to President Shehu Shagari (1980–1982).

In 1979, he was narrowly defeated by Abdulkadir Balarabe Musa in the election for Governor of Kaduna State. Kaita helped the NPN to impeach Governor Musa in June 1981. In 1982, after the death of the Emir, Kaita contested the emirship of Katsina.Usman Nagogo. He was elected Governor of Kaduna State in the 1983 election, holding office for a few months until the military coup in December of that year.

In 1995, after General Shehu Musa Yar'Adua was jailed by the Sani Abacha government, Kaita was appointed leader of Yar'Adua's Peoples Democratic Movement (PDM) which comprised politicians such as Atiku Abubakar, Abdullahi Aliyu Sumaila, Magaji Abdullahi and Rabiu Kwankwaso. The PDM merged with The New Dimension, The National Transformation Congress, some prominent members of the Eastern Mandate Union and some State chapters of the Committee for National Consensus (CNC) to form Peoples Consensus Party under which they seek registration during the Sani Abacha transition but they were not registered. Kaita was a member of the Constitutional Conference (1994–1995). He was a founding member of the People's Democratic Party PDP in 1998.

== Fourth Republic ==
The administration of President Olusegun Obasanjo, which came to power in May 1999, appointed Kaita chairman of one of the parastatals in the Ministry of Transport.

In August 2001, he was engaged in a struggle for control of the PDM movement with the Minister of Works and Housing, Tony Anenih.

In May 2002, he was president of the Nigerian Polo Association.

In June 2003, he was chairman of the Maritime Authority, a member of the board of trustees of the PDP, and a director of the SGBN Bank.

Kaita left the PDP to join others in forming the Action Congress (AC) party in September 2006; Vice President Atiku Abubakar, representing the Action Congress, launched his unsuccessful bid for the presidency in 2007.

In the run-up to the elections, the 74-year-old Kaita was arrested by the State Security Services on charges that he had recruited and trained hooligans.

In March 2010, there were rumors that Kaita might be returning to the PDP following a meeting with the Katsina State Governor Ibrahim Shema and other PDP leaders.

In a newspaper interview in April 2010, Kaita said that as chairman of a conclave of Atiku Abubakar's associates, he expected Atiku to rejoin the PDP.

On 19 August 2010, Kaita was received back to the PDP by Governor Shema, in an event attended by 50,000 decampees from the Action Congress in Ingawa, Kusada and Kankia local governments. He died on 2 January 2018, aged 85.

== See also ==
- List of governors of Kaduna State
- List of University of London people
