= Oyeleye Oyediran =

Nigerian political scientist

Oyeleye Oyediran (January 13, 1934 - December 11, 2018) was a Nigerian political scientist. A former Fulbright scholar, and a native of Ogbomosho in Oyo State, he has edited books like, Nigerian Government and Politics Under Military Rule, 1966-1979 and Survey of Nigerian Affairs, 1973-1977 and 1978-1979. He has remained a faculty at the Center for International Studies, at the East Carolina University, and Senior Fellow at the United States Institute of Peace, (1999–2000).

== Early life and education ==
He attended Baptist Boys High School in Abeokuta, the capital of Ogun State in South West Nigeria, and received his PH.D from the University of Pittsburgh.

== Career ==
He has served as Chairman of the Department of Political Science at the University of Lagos and was a lecturer at the University of Ibadan. During this period, he was Editor-in-chief of the Journal of Business and Social Studies for over ten years. He was a member of the 1975 Nigerian Constitution Drafting Committee, and from October 1999-July 2000, was a senior fellow at the United States Institute of Peace, in Washington D.C. He was also the first holder of the Distinguished River Endowed Chair at East Carolina University.

He has been a visiting lecturer at various institutions, including:

- The University of North Carolina
- The University of California at Los Angeles
- Duke University
- Institut de Sciences Politique in Switzerland.
- The Hoover Institution on War, Revolution and Peace

== Publications ==
- Nigerian legislative houses, which way?. University of Ibadan Consultancy Unit, 1980.
- Oyediran, O. (1979). Nigerian government and politics under military rule, 1966-79. Macmillan.
- Essays on Local Government and Administration in Nigeria, Surulere, Lagos, Nigeria, Project Publications, 1988.
- Transition Without End : Nigerian Politics and Civil Society under Babangida, edited by Larry Diamond, Anthony Kirk-Greene and Oyeleye Oyediran, Lynne Rienner Publishers (1997) ISBN 1-55587-591-2
- Nigeria : Politics of Transition and Governance, 1986-1996, edited by Oyeleye Oyediran and Adigun A.B. Agbaje. Dakar, Senegal, Council for the Development of Social Science Research in Africa (c1999) ISBN 2-86978-071-0
- Nigerian Government and Politics Under Military Rule, 1966-1979. Macmillan, 1979. ISBN 0-333-26898-9.
- Survey of Nigerian Affairs, 1973-1977 and 1978-1979. Nigerian Institute of International Affairs in co-operation with Macmillan Nigeria Publishers, 1981. ISBN 978-2276-49-9.
- Oyediran, O., & Agbaje, A. A. (Eds.). (1999). Nigeria: politics of transition and governance, 1986-1996. African Books Collective.
