= Lionel Brett =

Nigerian Supreme Court Justice and Solicitor General

Sir Lionel Brett (19 August 1911 – 10 September 1990) was an expatriate Solicitor General of Nigeria who later became a Justice of the Supreme Court in 1958.

Brett was born in Belfast, the son of Henry Robert Brett and Constance White. He was educated at Marlborough College before going to Magdalen College, Oxford where he studied Classics. He was called to the bar in 1937. He joined the army during World War II and finished his service as a Major. In 1946, he was appointed a Crown Counsel in Nigeria and later became the country's Solicitor General in 1953, he was the last expatriate to be in the position and was succeeded by Godwin Amachree. On 22 May 1958, he was appointed Justice of the Supreme Court. After, his retirement in 1968, he was commissioned to revise the laws of the old Bendel State which he published in seven volumes in 1976.

While in Nigeria, he was a member of both Ikoyi and the Metropolitan Club, he was a district Grand Master of the Freemason in the country.
