= Premier of Northern Nigeria =

- Badge of Northern Nigeria

- Flag of Northern Nigeria
- Incumbent; Interregnum
- Government of Northern Nigeria
- Style: The Right Honourable
- Reports to: Assembly of Northern Nigeria
- Residence: Arewa House, Kaduna
- Seat: Kaduna
- Appointer: Governor of Northern Nigeria
- Term length: 4 Years
- Formation: 1 January 1943

The Premier of Northern Nigeria was the head of government of Northern Nigeria. The office was established by the MacPherson's Constitution of 1951 that guaranteed the autonomy of Nigeria's Regions. Equivalent to the Office of Prime Minister, the Premier served as the head of a Westminster style government. The Officeholder was appointed by the Governor of Northern Nigeria with the approval of the Northern Nigerian house of assembly.
