= Abdulkadir Balarabe Musa =

Nigerian politician (1936–2020)

Governor of Kaduna State
- In office October 1979 – 23 June 1981
- Preceded by: Ibrahim Mahmud Alfa
- Succeeded by: Abba Musa Rimi

Personal details
- Born: 21 August 1936 Kaya, Kaduna State, Nigeria
- Died: 11 November 2020 (aged 84) Kaduna
- Party: People's Redemption Party (PRP)

Abdulkadir Balarabe Musa CFR (21 August 1936 – 11 November 2020) was a Nigerian left-wing politician who was elected Governor of Kaduna State, Nigeria during the Nigerian Second Republic, holding office from October 1979 until he was impeached on 23 June 1981. During the Nigerian Fourth Republic he was leader of the Conference of Nigerian Political Parties (CNPP), a coalition of opposition parties.

== Background ==
Musa was born on 21 August 1936 in Kaya, Kaduna State. He studied at Zaria Middle School (1947–1952) and at the Institute of Administration, Zaria (1952–1953). He was an accounts clerk (1953–1955) and a school teacher (1955–1960). He held various managerial positions related to accountancy in the period 1960 to 1976, while studying at different colleges in London to gain additional qualifications.

== Kaduna State governor ==
Musa was elected governor of Kaduna State in 1979 on the platform of the People's Redemption Party (PRP), a party founded by Mallam Aminu Kano. with others such as Abubakar Rimi, Sabo Bakin Zuwo, Abdullahi Aliyu Sumaila, Michael Imoudu, Chinua Achebe, Yusufu Bala Usman, Uche Chukwumerije, and Sule Lamido. The National Party of Nigeria (NPN) challenged his election unsuccessfully. His party was initially a member of the PPP alliance in opposition to the NPN, but later quietly withdrew. As Governor he was stalemated by the Kaduna State House of Assembly, which was dominated by NPN members. He was unable to form a cabinet since he refused to nominate NPN members and the House refused to ratify his candidates. Eventually the House impeached him in June 1981, making him the first Nigerian state governor to be impeached.

A leftist, when the Kaduna Polo Club sent Musa an invitation to join along with a mallet he refused the invitation and gave the mallet to a servant, saying "I don't play polo ... It is the game of the rich and powerful, of neo-colonialists". Musa later said he was impeached because he planned to have the state open small- and medium-sized industries, and this would deny the NPN members the opportunity of establishing their own enterprises. He did initiate some state-owned companies, but they were unprofitable and all were eventually closed down.

== Later political career ==
Musa continued to be active in politics. He was the PRP candidate for the presidency in the April 2003 elections, selected in February 2003. However, without even enough money to print posters he was not successful. In May 2003, the Inspector-General of Police Tafa Balogun refused a permit to the Conference of Nigerian Political Parties (CNPP), to hold a rally in Kano. As Chairman of the coalition, Musa said he refused to be intimidated, and the CNPP had other ways to achieve their objectives. Speaking as CNPP chairman in February 2004, Musa described President Olusegun Obasanjo's policies as "phantom and mirage", doing nothing for the people and serving only to enrich politicians and government officials. In the 2007 elections, the CNPP backed Muhammadu Buhari as a credible alternative to the PDP candidate Umaru Yar'Adua. In February 2009, Musa said "Capitalism is returning us to the era of slavery. The solution to the current crisis is the abolition of greediness and antagonistic competition in our economic systems".

Musa spoke at a public lecture and reception in January 2009 in honour of former Oyo State governor Lam Adesina. He said that electoral rigging had to be stopped, and said "we need a revolution in Nigeria to have a positive change in the political system". In November 2009, Musa said that Nigeria's economic system was based on narrow self-interest, with a disabling level of corruption, theft and waste of public resources. He expressed concern that the state might fail, as had happened in Somalia, but said this was unlikely since the USA would act to prevent it due to the strategic importance of Nigeria.

In an interview in April 2010, Musa said the electoral system was rigged to favour those with money. He was sceptical about whether implementing the recommendations of the Uwais committee, such as removing state electoral commissions and having all elections run by the Independent National Electoral Commission, would have any positive effect. However, he was cautiously optimistic that Labour could put up a credible showing against the People's Democratic Party (PDP) in the 2011 elections through alliances with other parties such as Action Congress. The same month, former Vice-President Atiku Abubakar said that Musa had obstructed formation of a mega opposition alliance because he did not want to lose the identity of his PRP in the larger group.

On 31 August 2018, Musa quit active politics due to health issues and announced his immediate resignation from chairmanship of People's Redemption Party.

Balarabe Musa died on 11 November 2020 in Kaduna due to a heart attack.
