= United National Independence Party (Nigeria) =

Political party in Nigeria

The United National Independence Party (UNIP) was a Nigerian political party formed in the mid-1950s. It was made up of a group of N.C.N.C members who were opposed to some of the policies of Nnamdi Azikiwe and had formed the National Independence Party. In 1954, the National Independence Party merged with Alvan Ikoku's United National Party to form the United National Independence Party.

The party was one of the few prominent and fairly popular groups that emerged to challenge Azikiwe and N.C.N.C in the Eastern region of Nigeria. Before the formation of UNIP, the Eastern Region was free from political competition, unlike its counterparts in the West and North, which had formidable foes to contend with.
