= People's Redemption Party =

Political party in Nigeria

- Chairperson: Alhaji Falalu Bello
- Founded: 1978
- Headquarters: Abuja
- Ideology: Social democracy; Democratic socialism
- Political position: Centre-left to left-wing
- Colours: Red, white, black
- Seats in the Senate: 0 / 109
- Seats in the House: 0 / 360
- Governorships: 0 / 36

Website
- prpnigeria.ng

The People's Redemption Party is a social democratic and democratic socialist political party in Nigeria. The Second Republic reincarnation of the Northern Elements Progressive Union and the Fourth Republican reincarnation of a similar namesake, the party was created by the supporters of Mallam Aminu Kano after his withdrawal from the National Party of Nigeria. Established in 1978, it is the longest surviving political party in Nigeria's history.

The original party was banned after the 1983 military coup led by General Muhammadu Buhari. In the Fourth Republic, the party with the same name resurfaced under the leadership of Abdulkadir Balarabe Musa but could not gather the same level of support as its Second Republic namesake.

== History ==
Following the formulation of a new constitution and an impending return to civil rule, Nigeria's top political elites organized a series of political conferences with a view to creating a political party that can transcend tribal boundaries, this culminated in the formation of the National Movement. In September 1978, however, a brawl in one of the finalizing meetings of the movement between Malam Aminu Kano (then a significant leftist champion) and some former members of the Northern People's Congress led to a section of mostly Marxist intellectuals breaking off, alleging a sidelining of leftists in Nigeria. These leftists formally declared the founding of the PRP on 27 September 1978.

=== 1980s ===
In the 1980s, a coalition of politicians styling themselves "Progressives" called for a national front against the ruling NPN and by 1981 a conference of opposition Governors in Nigeria had organized into a 'Progressive Governors Forum'. The active participation of PRP governors and MPs in these conferences that were by 1982 calling for a mega progressive party soon led to a crisis within the party. In mid-1982, suspension of PRP Governors by pro-Kano elements and a subsequent rejection of the suspension by Michael Imoudu (then Vice President of the party) led to official fractioning.

=== President ===
Upon formation of the PRP, an invitation was extended to Aminu Kano and other prominent leftists, and he was soon elected as the party's national president. In 1979, the party was able to capture two out of 19 states and came fourth in the national elections. Aminu Kano died in April 1983, just before that year's presidential election. Khalifa Hassan Yusuf succeeded him as party leader and presidential candidate.

== Fourth Republic ==
With the return to democratic rule in 1999, some former members of the now defunct PRP tried to reinstate it with little success. Though most of its former members still claim some sort of allegiance to the Sawabist block, they mostly have remained subsumed in other political parties.

Alhaji Balarabe Musa was its chairman since its reincarnation during the 4th Republic. On 31 August 2018, Balarabe Musa quit active politics due to health issues, and stepped down from his chairmanship position of the party to allow younger politicians to take over. Falalu Bello was announced as the new chairman of the party.

== See also ==
- Aminu Kano
- Progressive Governors Forum (PGF)
