= Ham people =

Nigerian ethnic group

Ham
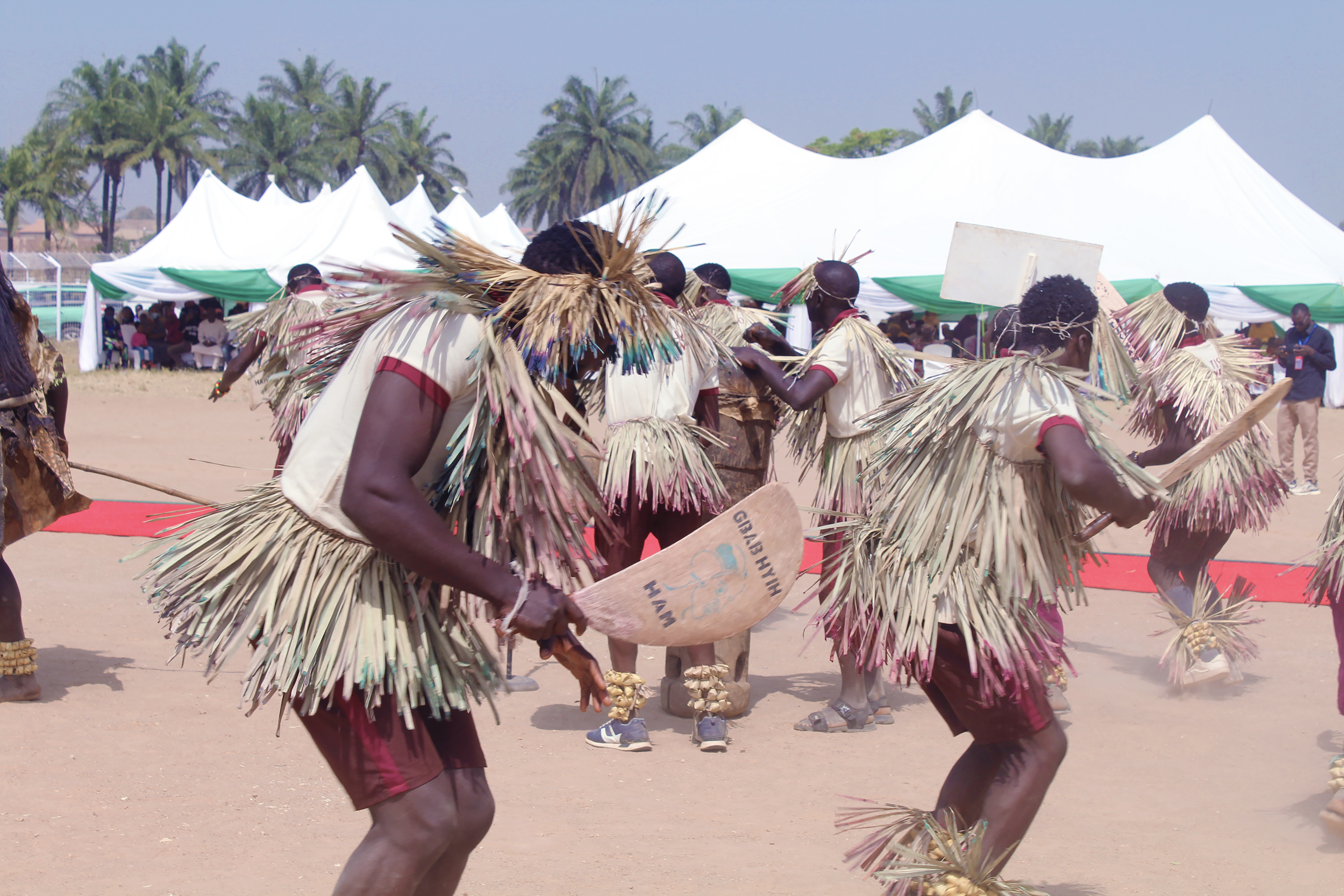
- Gbabhyi Ham, SK Fest 2024

Total population
- 300,000 (2014 NBTT)

Regions with significant populations
- Nigeria

Languages
- Hyam

Religion
- Christianity, Ku

Related ethnic groups
- Gwong, Anghan, Adara, Koro (Tinor), Atyap, Berom, Jukun, Efik, Tiv, Igbo, Yoruba, Edo and other Benue-Congo peoples of Middle Belt and southern Nigeria

The Ham people (exonyms: Jju: Ba̱daa, Tyap: A̱daa) are an ethnic group found in the southern part of Kaduna State in the northwestern region of Nigeria, predominantly in Jaba, Kachia and Kagarko Local Government Areas of southern Kaduna State, Nigeria. They speak the Hyam language and refer to themselves as Ham. They are known as the 'Jaba' in Hausa, but a recent study by a linguist who is a native of the area (John 2017) has definitely proven that the label 'Jaba' was derogatory and should be rejected. Some estimates place the Ham as numbering 400,000.

== History ==
There is a common misconception that the Ham people created the Nok culture after archaeological discoveries in the Ham village of Nok. The Nok culture flourished between c. 1500 BC — c. 1 BC while the Ham people only migrated to the area from Kano in the 17-18th century. The culture was so named because the terracotas that characterised the Nok Culture were first discovered in the Ham village called Nok. Later other archeological sites elsewhere were discovered as well.

== Culture ==
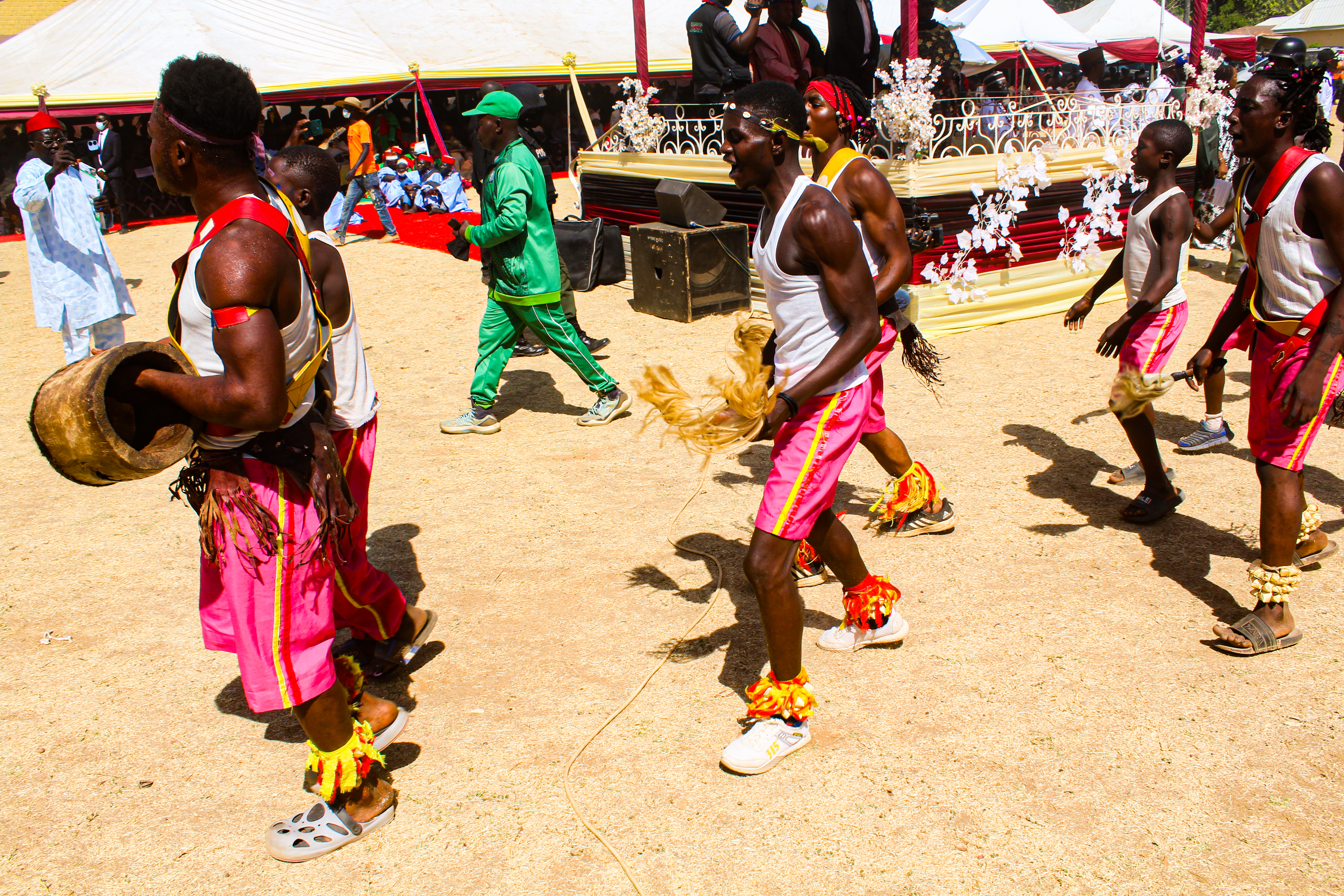
Young Ham men celebrating Tuk Ham festival 2025

The Tuk-Ham festival is celebrated each year at Kwain (Popularly known as Kwoi by the Hausa), a town in the Local Government Area of Jaba. It is celebrated around the Easter season.

== Religion ==
The majority of the Ham people are Christian, estimated at about 85%. About 75% of the population is defined by some sources as "Evangelical Christians", with 10% fitting other definitions of Christians.

== Language ==
The Ham speak Hyam language.

== Politics ==
Ham rulers are called Kpop Ham. Since 1974, the Kpop Ham is His Royal Highness (HRH) the Kpop-Ham Dr. Jonathan Danladi Gyet Maude (J.P.), OON.

== Notable people ==
Notable people of Ham origin include:

- Martin Luther Agwai
- Andrew Jonathan Nok
- Adamu Maikori, first lawyer in Southern Kaduna
- Audu Maikori, co-founder and group CEO of Chocolate City Entertainment record label
- Yahaya Maikori, co-founder of Chocolate City Entertainment record label
- Admiral Ishaya Iko Ibrahim, Former Chief of Naval Staff and Sarkin Yaki Ham
- Felix Hassan Hyet, Former Minister of Aviation
- Justice Danlami Sambo, Former Justice Sokoto High Court
- Late Dr Chris Abashiya, Author, Politician and Activist
- Late AVM Usman Ma'azu, Former Military Administrator of Kaduna State
- Col T.K Zabairu, Former Military Administrator of Imo State Yohanna Yarima Kure
- Yohanna Yarima Kure, Armed Forces Ruling Council, (1985-1987)
- Ambassador Bulus Lolo, RTD Permanent Secretary of the Ministry of Foreign Affairs
- Senator Haruna Aziz Zego, Senator 1999-2003
- Ambassador Nuhu Bajoga, Deputy Governor Kaduna State 2011-2015
- Late Reverend Dr. Byang Henry Kato, Pioneer African Theologian, author, First Secretary General AEA.
