= Adamu Maikori =

Nigerian lawyer, politician, and banker (1942–2020)

Adamu Audu Maikori
- Born: 1942; Dura, Northern Region, British Nigeria (now Dura, Kaduna State, Nigeria)
- Died: 8 September 2020 (aged 77–78)
- Occupations: • Lawyer • Banker • Civil servant • Military pilot • Politician
- Known for: Being the first professional lawyer in Southern Kaduna

Adamu Audu Maikori (1942 – 8 September 2020) was a Nigerian lawyer, banker and politician. In mid-September 2020, the Fundamental Rights in the Nigeria constitution was translated into his mother tongue, Hyam, by the Kaduna-based firm, House of Justice in his honour as the first indigenous lawyer from Southern Kaduna. This document was presented at the palace of the Kpop Ham, in Kwoi by the organisation's CEO, Gloria Mabeiam Ballason.

== Life and education ==
Maikori was born in Dura, Hamland, in 1942. He began his educational career at Maude Primary School, Kwoi. Over time, he went further to acquire premium education in London, Germany and Harvard Business School in the United States He married La'aitu (née Gyet Maude) of the Ham Royal House. They had five children, including Yahaya Maikori and Audu Maikori, both of whom are lawyers. At the time of death, he had three grandchildren and many "spiritual children".

== Working career ==
Maikori was the first lawyer from Southern Kaduna and was called to the Nigerian Bar in 1972. He had long career as a lawyer, teacher, flight cadet in the Nigerian Air Force, public prosecutor and as a banker.

He served as Director of Public Prosecutions in the Ministry of Justice and later as Chief Registrar of the Kaduna-Katsina High Court. On leaving public service, he became the Executive Director of Nigeria Merchant Bank and afterwards became a co-founder of North South Bank.

He was also the Chairman of the ECWA working committee on the book, An Introduction to the History of SIM/ECWA in Nigeria, 1893-1993.

== Political career ==
Maikori ran in the 1991 elections for the Governor of Kaduna State but was unsuccessful in the primaries; he lost the SDP ticket to Ango Abdullahi who scored 166,857 votes (59.7%) while he scored 67,312 votes (21%). He also ran in but was unsuccessful in 2003 and 2007 races for the Senate to represent Kaduna South Senatorial District, both of which he lost to Isaiah Balat and Caleb Zagi, respectively.

== Demise ==
His son, a co-founder of the Chocolate City Group, Audu Maikori, reportedly announced the death of his father, on 8 September 2020, aged 78.

== Legacy ==
In his words, his son Audu recounts:

"He taught me about hard work, integrity, honesty and most importantly the place of God in my life... Even my foray into entertainment was closely influenced by his love for music and that of my late mother. He was actually a choirmaster!"
