= Deputy governor of Kaduna State =

Second highest-ranking official in the executive branch of Kaduna State in Nigeria

Deputy Governor of Kaduna State
- Incumbent; Hadiza Balarabe since 29 May 2019
- Executive Branch of the Kaduna State Government
- Style: Deputy Governor (informal); Her Excellency (courtesy)
- Status: Second highest executive branch officer
- Member of: Kaduna State Executive Branch; Kaduna State Cabinet
- Seat: Kaduna
- Nominator: Gubernatorial candidate
- Appointer: Direct popular election or, if vacant, Governor via House of Assembly confirmation
- Term length: Four years; renewable once
- Constituting instrument: Constitution of Nigeria
- Inaugural holder: Stephen Shekari (Fourth Republic)
- Succession: First
- Website: kdsg.gov.ng

The deputy governor of Kaduna State is the second-highest officer in the executive branch of the government of Kaduna State, Nigeria, after the governor of Kaduna State, and ranks first in line of succession. The deputy governor is directly elected together with the governor to a four-year term of office.

Hadiza Balarabe is the current deputy governor, having assumed office on 29 May 2019.

== Qualifications ==
As in the case of the Governor, in order to be qualified to be elected as deputy governor, a person must:

- be at least thirty-five (35) years of age;
- be a Nigerian citizen by birth;
- be a member of a political party with endorsement by that political party;
- have School Certificate or its equivalent.

== Responsibilities ==
The deputy governor assists the governor in exercising primary assignments and is also eligible to replace a dead, impeached, absent or ill Governor as required by the 1999 Constitution of Nigeria.

== List of deputy governors ==
Name	Took office	Left office	Time in office	Party	Elected	Governor
Abba Musa Rimi (born 1940)	1 October 1979	23 June 1981	1 year, 265 days	People's Redemption Party	1979	Abdulkadir Balarabe Musa
James Bawa Magaji	3 January 1992	17 November 1993	1 year, 318 days	National Republican Convention	1991	Mohammed Dabo Lere
Stephen Shekari (1948–2005)	29 May 1999	10 July 2005	6 years, 42 days	Peoples Democratic Party	1999; 2003	Ahmed Makarfi
Patrick Yakowa (1948–2012)	21 July 2005	20 May 2010	4 years, 303 days	Peoples Democratic Party	2007	Ahmed Makarfi
Patrick Yakowa (1948–2012)	21 July 2005	20 May 2010	4 years, 303 days	Peoples Democratic Party	2007	Namadi Sambo
Mukhtar Yero (born 1968)	29 May 2010	16 December 2012	2 years, 201 days	Peoples Democratic Party	2011	Patrick Yakowa
Nuhu Bajoga (born 1949)	28 December 2012	29 May 2015	2 years, 152 days	Peoples Democratic Party		Mukhtar Yero
Barnabas Bala (1956–2021)	29 May 2015	29 May 2019	4 years	All Progressives Congress	2015	Nasir El-Rufai
Hadiza Balarabe (born 1966)	29 May 2019	Incumbent	7 years, 109 days	All Progressives Congress	2019; 2023	Nasir El-Rufai
Hadiza Balarabe (born 1966)	29 May 2019	Incumbent	7 years, 109 days	All Progressives Congress	2019; 2023	Uba Sani

== See also ==
- Governor of Kaduna State
- List of governors of Kaduna State
