= Sabzuro =

Sabzuro Sabzuru Sab-zuro
- Ward
- Location within Nigeria
- Coordinates: 09°28′N 07°59′E
- Country: Nigeria
- State: Kaduna State
- LGA: Jaba
- Chiefdom: Ham (Jaba)

Government
  - Type: Elective Monarchy
  - Kpop Ham: Kpop (Dr.) Jonathan Danladi Gyet Maude (JP, OON)
- Time zone: UTC+01:00 (WAT)
- Climate: Aw

Sabzuro (Sabzuru, Sab-zuro (Hyam: Sabzuro) is an electoral ward and a significant settlement in Jaba Local Government Area, in southern Kaduna state in the Middle Belt region of Nigeria. Historically, it is regarded as one of the earliest areas of settlement for the Ham (Jaba) people, the indigenous inhabitants of the region. The area is known for its agrarian economy, with ginger production being a particularly prominent activity.

== Location and geography ==
Sabzuro is situated in the southern part of Kaduna State, near the Jos Plateau region and Nigeria's capital city, Abuja. It is an administrative subdivision of Jaba Local Government Area , which cover an area of 531 square kilometres. The region features a landscape of hills and grasslands, with the local climate being generally pleasant, especially during the dry season. The postal code for Sabzuro, along with other settlements in the Kwoi district of Jaba LGA, is 801109

== History ==
Sabzuro holds historical importance for the Ham (Jaba) people, the predominant ethnic group in Jaba LGA. Local history suggests that Sabzuro may have been one of the earliest sites inhabited by the Ham, predating the modern town of Kwai. The Ham people are also closely associated with the ancient Nok culture, which produced terracotta sculptures in the area.

== Economy ==
=== Livelihood ===
The economy of Sabzuro is primarily agrarian, with a strong focus on farming and trading.

Ginger production: Jaba LGA is one of Nigeria's highest ginger-producing areas, and ginger farming is a major economic activity in Sabzuro. Research studies have examined the socio-economic aspects of ginger production in the area, including the profitability and factors affecting its cultivation.

Cooperative society: The "Sab-Zuro Ginger Farmers Cooperative Society" is active in the area, supporting local farmers in their production and trade.

Other activities: Hunting and general trading also contribute to the local economy.

== Culture and demographics ==
Ethnic group

Language

Religion:

== Administration ==
Sabzuro is one of the ten electoral wards that constitute the Jaba Local Government Area. The local government, headquartered in the town of Kwoi, is responsible for overseeing economic and developmental activities within the area, including Sabzuru.

== See also ==
1. Jaba Local Government Area
2. Ham people
3. Nok culture
4. Kaduna State
