= Maikori =

- Gender: Male
- Language: Hausa

Origin
- Origin: Nigerian
- Meaning: Master of the quiver
- Region of origin: North-West, Nigeria

Maikori is a Nigerian surname of Hausa origin. The name "Maikori" means "master of the quiver".

== Notable individuals with the name ==
- Adamu Maikori (1942–2020), Nigerian lawyer, banker, and politician
- Audu Maikori (born 1975), Nigerian lawyer, entrepreneur, social activist, and public speaker
- Yahaya Maikori, Nigerian lawyer, brother of Audu
