= Nuhu Bajoga =

Nigerian politician (born 1949)

Deputy Governor of Kaduna State
- In office 28 December 2012 – 29 May 2015
- Governor: Mukhtar Yero
- Preceded by: Mukhtar Yero
- Succeeded by: Barnabas Bala

Nigerian Ambassador to Poland
- In office 2004–2007
- President: Olusegun Obasanjo

Personal details
- Born: Nuhu Audu Bajoga; 4 July 1949 (age 77) Kwoi, Northern Region, British Nigeria (now in Kaduna State, Nigeria)
- Party: Peoples Democratic Party
- Education: Kaduna Polytechnic
- Occupation: Politician

Nuhu Audu Bajoga (born 4 July 1949) is a Nigerian politician who served as the deputy governor of Kaduna State from 2012 to 2015, and as Nigerian Ambassador to Poland from 2004 to 2007.

== Background ==
Nuhu Bajoga was born to the family of Mallam Nyam and Mama Hannatu Audu in Kwoi, present Jaba Local Government Area of Kaduna State. Bajoga earned a diploma in Accounting from the Kaduna Polytechnic. Bajoga was appointed Ambassador extraordinary and plenipotentiary of the Federal Republic of Nigeria to Poland and concurrently accredited to the Czech Republic from 2004 to 2007. In December 2012, he was appointment as deputy governor of Kaduna State.
