= Hassan Rilwan =

Nigerian public administrator

Executive Secretary of the Kaduna State Scholarship and Loans Board
- In office September 2019 – 2022
- Governor: Nasir Ahmad el-Rufai

Special Adviser to the Governor of Kaduna State
- Governor: Nasir Ahmad el-Rufai

Personal details
- Occupation: Public administrator, executive
- Known for: Public sector educational reforms, scholarship administration

Hassan Rilwan is a Nigerian public administrator who served as the Executive Secretary of the Kaduna State Scholarship and Loans Board from 2019 to 2022 under Governor Nasir Ahmad el-Rufai. He subsequently served as Special Adviser to the Governor.

== Early life and career ==
Rilwan is an Associate Fellow of the Nigerian Leadership Institute and an alumnus of the Young African Leaders Initiative (YALI) fellowship. In 2009, he served on the Federal Government Ministerial Committee on the establishment of the Almajiri Education System, which was established to integrate traditional Islamic education with modern school curricula across Northern Nigeria.

== Public service ==
In September 2019, Governor Nasir Ahmad el-Rufai appointed Rilwan as Executive Secretary of the Kaduna State Scholarship and Loans Board.

During his tenure, the board managed state-sponsored merit-based international scholarships for foreign postgraduate studies and implemented policy adjustments to protect educational funding during the COVID-19 pandemic. In August 2021, under his leadership, the board coordinated the emergency security evacuation of tertiary institution students of Kaduna origin from Jos, Plateau State during inter-communal unrest.

Following his term at the scholarship board, Rilwan was appointed Special Adviser within the Kaduna State Government.
