= Daudawa =

- Location within Nigeria
- Coordinates: 11.62936°N 7.156561°E
- Country: Nigeria
- State: Katsina State
- Local Government Area: Faskari
- Elevation: 634 m (2,080 ft)

Daudawa is a Fulani community in Faskari Local Government Area, Katsina State, Nigeria. The average elevation above sea level is 634 meters.

Daudawa is the birthplace of Nasir Ahmad el-Rufai, Minister of the Federal Capital Territory (FCT) of Abuja from 2003 to 2007 and former Governor of Kaduna State.
