= Mohammed Bello El-Rufai =

Nigerian politician

Member of the House of Representatives of Nigeria from Kaduna
- Incumbent
- Assumed office 11 June 2023
- Preceded by: Samaila Suleiman
- Constituency: Kaduna North

Personal details
- Born: 11 January 1988 (age 38) Kaduna State, Nigeria
- Party: Africa Democratic Congress (ADC)
- Parents: Nasir El-Rufai (father); Hadiza Isma El-Rufai (mother)
- Education: Wheaton College (Massachusetts); Georgetown University; British School of Lome
- Occupation: entrepreneur; politician
- Website: belloelrufai.com

Mohammed Bello El-Rufai is a Nigerian politician, currently serving as a member of the Nigerian House of Representatives representing Kaduna North Federal Constituency in the 10th National Assembly, and son to the former governor of Kaduna State, Mallam Nasir El-Rufai. He was appointed as chairman of the House Committee on Banking Regulations.

== Early life and education ==
Mohammed Bello El-Rufai was born on 11 January 1988, in Kaduna, Nigeria. He earned his BSc in political science and international relations with a minor in religious studies from Wheaton College, Massachusetts. In 2015, he obtained an MSc in Public Relations and Corporate Communications from Georgetown University.

== Career ==
Bello commenced his career as a manager at Huawei Nigeria, He went into politics during his National Youth Service Corps (NYSC) in 2015, engaging with the Good Governance Group (3G) and co-founding the Rescue Kaduna Group (RKG), a political action committee, before the 2015 general elections. During this time, he was appointed as the director of youth mobilization for the Buhari Campaign Organization (BCO). He then transitioned from the private sector to serve as senior legislative aide and chief of staff to Senator Uba Sani, the incumbent governor of Kaduna State, from 2019 to 2022. He holds a position as a board member of the Yasmin El-Rufai Foundation (YELF) and is also behind the Hamza El-Rufai Foundation (HELF).

== Political career ==
Mohammed Bello El-Rufai is a member of the African Democratic Congress (ADC). In February 2023, he entered politics and secured the House of Representatives seat for Kaduna North Federal Constituency with 51,052 votes. In the 10th Assembly, he serves as the chairman of the House Committee on Banking Regulations.

== Personal life ==
Bello is the first son of Nasir Ahmed El-Rufai, the former governor of Kaduna State from 2015 to 2023 and Hadiza Isma El-Rufai. He is married to Aisha, a daughter of former military administrator for Plateau and Niger States, Colonel Habibu Shuaibu.
