= Audu Maikori =

Nigerian lawyer and entrepreneur

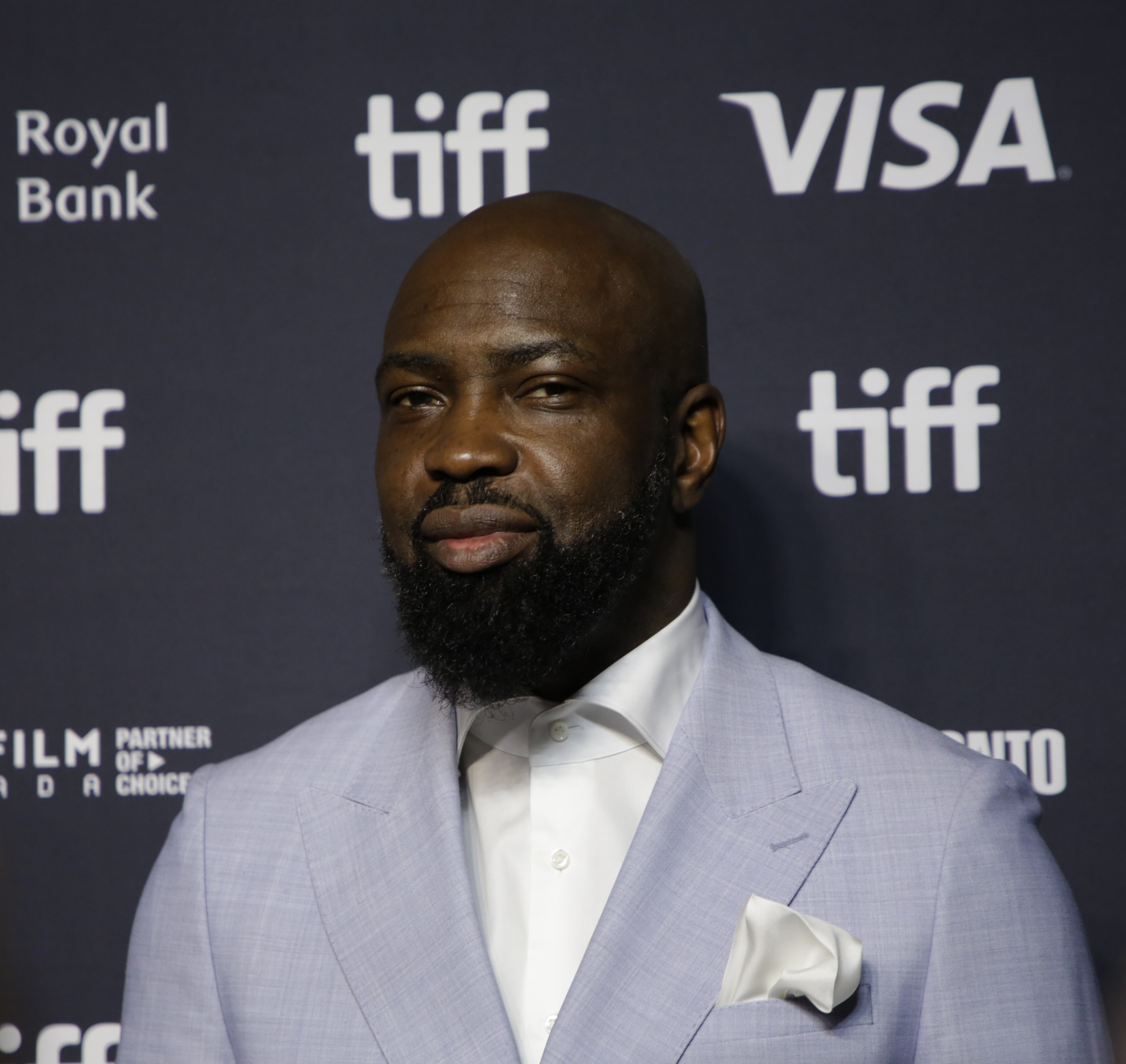
- Maikori in 2025
- Born: 13 August 1975 (age 50); Kaduna, Kaduna State, Nigeria
- Education: University of Jos; Nigerian Law School; MIT Sloan School of Management
- Alma mater: King's College, Lagos
- Occupations: Lawyer, entrepreneur, social activist, public speaker, creative industry professional, Co-founder & Executive Chairman of the Chocolate City
- Years active: 2001-present
- Known for: Nigerian Idol, Chocolate City Music
- Notable work: Chocolate City Group
- Parents: Adamu Maikori (father); Lai'atu Maikori (née Gyet Maude) (mother)
- Awards: see below

Audu Maikori (born 13 August 1975, in Kaduna) is a Nigerian lawyer, entrepreneur, social activist, public speaker, and creative industry expert. He is the co-founder and executive vice chairman of the Chocolate City Group, the mother company of one of the leading African record label Chocolate City Entertainment. He is well known as the founder of Chocolate City, an entertainment lawyer, and is regarded as the "Simon Cowell" in Nigerian Idol's first season. He won multiple awards during his career, including the International Young Music Entrepreneur of the Year award in 2007.

== Early life and education ==
Audu Maikori was born in Kaduna State (but hails from Kwoi, in Jaba local government, home to the infamous Nok Culture) to Adamu Maikori a renowned lawyer and politician, and Laiatu Maikori (née Gyet Maude - the Ham Royal family). He was raised in Lagos and attended A.D.R.A.O. International School and King's College before obtaining his law degree from the University of Jos in 1999. He later obtained his Bachelor of Laws (B.L.) from the Law school Abuja.

== Career ==
=== Early entertainment career ===
In 1997, Audu and his friends at the University of Jos started discussing the possibilities of setting up a club. After a debate on the name of the club, Audu suggested naming the club Chocolate City. Chocolate City became the biggest rave around the Universities in northern Nigeria.

=== The Guild of Artistes and Poets (GAP) ===
During his National Youth Service Corps (NYSC) program Audu and his friend, Paul Okeugo, founded the Guild of Artistes and Poets (GAP), a non-profit arts society. The GAP held its first meeting in April 2001. The GAP formed strategic alliances with the Ministry of Culture and Tourism, the British Council and held art exhibitions in partnership with the French Cultural Centre. The GAP expanded its reach to Jos, Plateau State, and Lagos State. By 2005 the GAP had over 300 active members.

=== Legal career ===
Audu was called to the Nigerian Bar Association in January 2001 and started his legal career working as an Associate with the litigation-inclined firm of Chief Afe Babalola SAN & Co where he worked from 2001 to 2003. He worked as a legal advisor to the leasing company of Nigeria (a subsidiary of Bank of Industry), and company secretary of Abuja Markets Management Limited.

In 2006, Maikori was appointed Senior Legal consultant with CPCS Transcom International, where he worked on the legal and regulatory aspects of privatization transactions including the Nigeria Ports Authority, Nigerian Railway Corporation, and the unbundling and privatization of PHCN. He represented Nigeria in the UNIDROIT Sub-Committee of governmental experts for the preparation of a preliminary draft Protocol to the Convention on International Interests in Mobile Equipment on Matters specific to Space Assets in 2005.

In May 2007, Maikori co-organized the first Nigerian International Music Summit in March 2007. Over 400 music industry stakeholders drawn from all over Nigeria attended the event. Maikori is a member of the Chartered Institute of Arbitrators UK, International Association of Entertainment Lawyers, the Nigerian Bar Association and International Bar Association (IBA).

In 2002, he along with his brother Yahaya Maikori started Law Allianz, a firm of legal practitioners based in Lagos and Abuja. He was selected as a lead legal consultant for key national infrastructure projects including the Lagos Rail Mass Transit project (2008), Abuja Mass Transit project (2006-2008) and Kano Mass transit project in 2011. In March 2015, Audu resigned from 'Law Allianz' to concentrate on other business affairs.

=== Chocolate City ===
Chocolate City Limited was registered in October 2003 but commenced business in 2005. Audu partnered with Paul Okeugo and his brother Yahaya Maikori as directors of the company. Later that year he, alongside Paul Okeugo and two other partners, produced the first event under the 'Chocolate City' banner in partnership with British American Tobacco, which was held at the University of Maiduguri. Audu was introduced to a song called Na Ba Ka by an artist named Jeremiah Gyang by Six Foot Plus. In January 2005, Chocolate City signed Jeremiah Gyang under a recording and management contract and re-released the album 'Na Ba Ka'. In mid-2006, M.I was signed up to Chocolate City.

In 2012, after a corporate restructuring, Chocolate City Group was formed with renowned businessman and lawyer Hakeem Bello-Osagie joining the board as Chairman. Four companies were formed to constitute the group namely Chocolate City Music, Chocolate City Media, Chocolate City Distribution and STM with Audu appointed as President of the Group. In March 2015, Audu announced the return of Jesse Jagz to Chocolate City. On 30 June 2015 Audu via Twitter announced his exit as CEO of Chocolate City Music and the appointment of M.I as the new CEO of Chocolate City Music, with label mate Ice Prince Zamani as the Vice President of the music label. Audu also announced the objectives for the 3 Chocolate City subsidiaries to include radio, television and film.

On 30 June 2015, Audu resigned as CEO of Chocolate City Music handing the reigns to former vice president of the label, M.I. Ice Prince was made the new vice president of Chocolate City.

In March 2018, Chocolate City launched CCX Lounge- a live music venue and lounge located at the prestigious Jabi Lake Mall, in Abuja. The 400-capacity venue is purpose-built for live music and its decor has been hailed as authentic Afro Nigerian by Mode Men Magazine.

=== Activism ===
Maikori has received commendations for his work in developing the youth including being invited to Albania in 2008 to deliver a keynote speech at a seminar organized by the Albania Ministry of Youth and Employment, Minister of Culture and British Council.

In 2010, Maikori was part of the Enough is Enough campaign which saw thousands of Nigerians protest against issues. In a four-hour protest, they marched to the National Assembly in Abuja. Maikori became the face of Enough is Enough after a police officer warned him to back down or be shot; Maikori refused to back down. He later led the other protesters to march on peacefully to make their protests heard by the National Assembly.

Southern Kaduna killings

Maikori was very vocal against the Southern Kaduna killings by suspected Fulani herdsmen who killed over 250 men and women of Southern Kaduna origin. He was vocal about the seeming neglect by the Kaduna State Governor and The Federal Government of Nigeria, especially when the Kaduna State Governor Mallam El Rufai admitted to paying Fulani herdsmen compensation to "stop" them from killing the predominantly Christian Southern Kaduna population. In March 2017, he was arrested and arraigned by the Kaduna State (his state of origin) Governor over alleged incitement to violence. On 28 October 2017, the Nigerian media was awash with headlines announcing the victory of Maikori in which forty million (N40,000,000) Naira was awarded to Maikori as damages against the Governor of Kaduna State, Mal. Nasir El-Rufai and the Nigerian Police Force. Maikori had brought a case of unlawful arrest and abuse of his fundamental human rights when Gov. El-Rufai caused his arrest and detention on 17 February 2017.

=== National service ===
On 13 February 2012, Audu Maikori was appointed to represent the Nigerian Youth as a member of the Presidential Committee on the Subsidy Reinvestment and Empowerment Programme (SURE-P), the committee was formed by President Goodluck Jonathan himself. Maikori was the youngest member of the committee. He was placed in charge of the Graduate Internship Scheme which under his coordination grew the number of employed interns from 1,800 interns in 2013 to 22,000 interns by January 2015.

In May 2012 Maikori was elected to serve as a member of the board of COSON. Maikori was one of those behind the lobby for the NCC to officially appoint a CMO to collect royalties for songwriters and performers after 13 years of the NCC failing to settle the dispute between the MCSN and PMRS, both de-registered CMOs which had been embroiled in legal battles for supremacy for years. His appointment has been lauded as the right step in the right direction by music industry stakeholders.

=== Public speaker ===
Maikori is also a public speaker and has traveled widely to speak on entrepreneurship and youth development. He was a speaker at the M.I.T Legatum Annual conference Visions and Ventures in 2013. In 2014 he was invited to speak at the Oxford University African Business Conference. In 2016, he was selected as a panelist and moderator at The Global Africa Investment Summit which was hosted by President Paul Kagame in Kigali, Rwanda. According to an article published by YNaija magazine in March 2014, Audu is listed as one of the most powerful people in Nigerian Entertainment. In October 2015, Audu was appointed the Chairman of the Nigerian Digital Music Monitoring Group, to develop specific methods for the implementation of the resolutions of the Summit.

=== Nigerian Idol ===
In September 2010, Maikori was made a judge on the first season of Nigerian Idol alongside Yinka Davies and Jeffrey Daniel. The show proved to be a ratings success, but a year later he left the series to concentrate on other commitments, and was replaced by singer-publisher Charly Boy.

== Achievements ==
=== Awards and accolades ===
- International Young Music Entrepreneur of the Year 2007 (Nigeria)
- International Young Music Entrepreneur of the Year 2007 (Global Winner)
- Entertainment Executive of the year 2011 by the Nigerian Entertainment Award (NEA)
- Award for Outstanding Award in Music and Entertainment by the National Youth Merit Awards 2011
- Young Entrepreneur of the Year (2011) – Diaspora Professionals Award 2011
- Mentor of the Year – 2010- Enterprise Foundation
- Creative Entrepreneur of the Year for Music – 2011- CIAN
- Winner – African Awards for Entrepreneurship 2011 by Legatum & Omidhyar Network
- Entertainment Executive of the Year – 2012- Nigerian Reunion Corporation
- SME Leader Award- 2014 by Fidelity Bank
- National Youth Merit Award in Entertainment – NYMA 2012
- Award for Excellence – Nigerian Law School Class of 2013
- Award for Leadership in Governance – Junior Chambers International (JCI) -2013
- Enterprise Award for Entertainment - Southern Kaduna Peoples Union(SOKAPU) 2015
- City People Magazine Special Recognition for outstanding contribution to the Nigerian music industry (2011, 2015 and 2016)

In 2008, at the inaugural edition of the United Kingdom Young Music Entrepreneur, Maikori was nominated to serve as a judge alongside four other British music industry judges, making him the African judge in the history of the competition.

On 29 June 2007, he won the International Young Music Entrepreneur of the Year (IYMEY) for his work with Chocolate City beating off international competition from Egypt, India, Indonesia, Latvia, Lithuania, Malaysia, Philippines, Poland and Tanzania.

He received special judges commendation as well as $15,000 Dollars in prize money.

In December 2011, Chocolate City Group, under Audu's leadership, was named winner of the prestigious Africa Awards for Entrepreneurship in Nairobi, Kenya. Chocolate City was selected from over 3,300 applicants from 48 African countries to win a prize of $50,000.

In November 2014, he was inducted as a Fellow of the Nigerian Leadership Institute(NLI) in November at the NLI-Yale Leadership Conference which was held at the campus in New Haven.

=== Fellowships ===
- Fellow – Nigerian Leadership Initiative (NLI)
- Life Fellow – Guild of Artistes and Poets (GAP)
- Honorary Fellow – Institute of Chartered Portfolio Management Nigeria

=== Judge ===
Audu has served as a judge on numerous entrepreneurship and innovation competitions both locally and internationally which include:-

- M.I.T Inclusive Innovation Competition - 2018
- Chivas The Venture Competition - 2015 and 2016
- Etisalat Prize for Innovation- 2012,2013,2014 and 2015
- Microsoft Passion to Empire Competition- 2015
- SheLeads Africa -2014
- British Council International Young Fashion Entrepreneur of the Year - 2009
- British Council International Young Music Entrepreneur of the Year - 2008 & 2009
- British Council United Kingdom Young Music Entrepreneur of the Year - 2008
