= Usman Mu'azu =

Governor of Kaduna State
- In office January 1984 – August 1985
- Preceded by: Lawal Kaita
- Succeeded by: Abubakar Dangiwa Umar

Personal details
- Born: 1942 Jaba LGA, Kaduna State, Nigeria
- Died: May 2008 (aged 65–66) Kaduna

Air Vice-Marshal Usman Mu'azu (1942–2008) was the military governor of Kaduna State, Nigeria, from January 1984 to August 1985 during the military regime of General Muhammadu Buhari. Mu'azu was born in Kwoi, Northern Region (now in Jaba Local Government Area, Kaduna State) of Nigeria, in 1942. He attended Provincial Secondary School, Zaria, and the Institute of Administration, Ahmadu Bello University, Zaria. He attended the Nigerian Defence Academy, Kaduna, and had further training in West Germany and the United States of America. Muazu served in various capacities in the Nigeria Air force, including service in the Nigeria Air force Command, Command and Staff College, Jaji and Command Training College, Kaduna. He was administrator of Nigerian Airways and Air Officer Commanding Training Command, Nigerian Air Force before being appointed military governor of Kaduna State in January 1984.

After he had left office, violence broke out between the Atyap and Hausa people in Zangon Kataf in 1992 which eventually led to several hundred deaths. Muazu headed a committee with seven Atyap and seven Hausa to recommend methods of settling the disputes. One recommendation was to create the Atyap Chiefdom. Since there measures were implemented, there has been no further violence. Following the return to democracy in 1999, he became a prominent member of the Arewa Consultative Forum, a Northern lobbying group. Mu'azu died in May 2008.
