= 2007 Nigerian Senate elections in Kebbi State =

The 2007 Nigerian Senate election in Kebbi State was held on 21 April 2007, to elect members of the Nigerian Senate to represent Kebbi State. Adamu Aliero representing Kebbi Central, Abubakar Tanko Ayuba representing Kebbi South and Umaru Argungu representing Kebbi North all won on the platform of the People's Democratic Party.

== Overview ==
Affiliation	Party		Total
Affiliation	AC	PDP	Total
Before Election			3
After Election	0	3	3

== Summary ==
District	Incumbent	Party	Elected Senator	Party
Kebbi Central			Adamu Aliero	PDP
Kebbi South			Abubakar Tanko Ayuba	PDP
Kebbi North			Umaru Argungu	PDP

== Results ==
=== Kebbi Central ===
The election was won by Adamu Aliero of the Peoples Democratic Party (Nigeria).

2007 Nigerian Senate election in Kebbi State
Party	Candidate	Votes	%
PDP	Adamu Aliero		
Total votes			
PDP hold			

=== Kebbi South ===
The election was won by Abubakar Tanko Ayuba of the Peoples Democratic Party (Nigeria).

2007 Nigerian Senate election in Kebbi State
Party	Candidate	Votes	%
PDP	Abubakar Tanko Ayuba		
Total votes			
PDP hold			

=== Kebbi North ===
The election was won by Umaru Argungu of the Peoples Democratic Party (Nigeria).

2007 Nigerian Senate election in Kebbi State
Party	Candidate	Votes	%
PDP	Umaru Argungu		
Total votes			
PDP hold			

=== Succession ===
Adamu Aliero was later appointed Minister of FCT in 2008, and he was succeeded by Abubakar Atiku Bagudu.
