= Hameed Ali =

Nigerian military administrator and former customs comptroller (born 1955)

Colonel Hameed Ali CFR

Comptroller-General of the Nigerian Customs Service
- In office 27 August 2015 – June 19, 2023
- President: Muhammadu Buhari
- Preceded by: Abdullahi Dikko
- Succeeded by: Bashir Adewale Adeniyi

Governor of Kaduna State
- In office 22 August 1996 – August 1998
- President: Sani Abacha
- Preceded by: Lawal Jafaru Isa
- Succeeded by: Umar Farouk Ahmed

Personal details
- Born: 15 January 1955 (age 71) Dass, Northern Region, British Nigeria (now Bauchi State, Nigeria)
- Party: All Progressives Congress
- Spouses: Hadiza Jummai (died 2018); Zainab Abdullahi (m. 2020)
- Education: Nigerian Defence Academy; Sam Houston State University

Military service
- Allegiance: Nigeria
- Branch: Nigerian Army
- Service years: 1974–1998
- Rank: Colonel

Hameed Ibrahim Ali CFR (born 15 January 1955) is a retired army officer and former Comptroller General of the Nigerian Customs Service from 2015 to 2023. He previously served as Military Governor of Kaduna State from 1996 to 1998. After retirement, he became Secretary of the Arewa Consultative Forum a political and cultural association of leaders in Northern Nigeria.

He is a member of the All Progressives Congress, and has supported Muhammadu Buhari's presidential bids in 2003, 2007, 2011, 2015 and 2019. Coming from a Buharist political background, he has promoted trade protectionist and strict law and order policies within the Buhari administration.

== Early life ==
Ali was born and raised in Dass, Bauchi State. He is a resident of Kaduna State.

== Military career ==
Ali was commissioned in 1977 after he received his training at the Nigerian Defence Academy in Kaduna. He attended Sam Houston State University from 1984 to 1988. And holds a bachelor's and master's degrees in criminology, and an educational certificate from the academy.

In 1981, Ali was a general staff officer in the Military Police Headquarters. In 1992, he was posted to the 1st Division in Kaduna, as a general staff officer. Ali was the commander of the Special Investigation Bureau in Apapa from 1994 to 1996. In 1998, Ali was made Colonel (Training) TRADOC, in Minna before being retired.

In 1995, he was the leading military member of the special tribunal set up by the regime of Sani Abacha (the civilian members were Justice Auta and Justice Arikpo) that tried and sentenced Ken Saro-Wiwa and eight other Ogoni environmental activists to death by hanging.

== Political career ==
=== Governor of Kaduna ===
Ali served as the military administrator of Kaduna State from August 1996 to August 1998 during the military regime of General Sani Abacha. In October 1997, he sacked about 30,000 striking civil servants in the state, and detained 18 local government chairmen.

A journalist who reported on the story published an article in a local magazine, was allegedly arrested, severely beaten, then taken to the Government House and further tortured. Ali later denied the allegations.

=== Presidential elections ===
After his military retirement, he became secretary of the Arewa Consultative Forum – a political and cultural association of leaders in Northern Nigeria, and a supporter of Muhammadu Buhari's presidential campaigns. Ali was a staunch opponent of Olusegun Obasanjo's Third Term Agenda. In June 2006, Ali stated that the presidency would return to the North in the 2007 Nigerian general election. He later supported Atiku Abubakar's comments to the effect that Obasanjo would honour his pledge to vacate office in 2007.

== Head of the Nigerian Customs Service ==
On 27 August 2015, Ali was appointed the Comptroller General of the Nigerian Customs by President Muhammadu Buhari. In 2017, Ali had a confrontation with the Nigerian Senate over his refusal to appear in uniform.

As comptroller general, he has been pragmatic in office, tackling many chronic problems in service including personnel shortage, corruption and border insecurity. The personnel shortage problem was solved with the recruitment of thousands of personnel for active duty. He has taken precautions to prevent corruption, using measures to ensure that funds are used prudently. He has introduced electronic clearing centres as part of measures to rid corruption. In 2019, Ali effected the closure of all land borders and subsequently imposed a ban on all imports and exports across the borders.

== Personal life ==
Hameed Ali was married to Hajiya Hadiza Jummai Ali until her death at the age of 53 in 2018. They had four children together.

In 2020, Hameed Ali married Hajiya Zainab Abdullahi.

== Awards ==
In October 2022, a Nigerian national honour of Commander of the Order of the Federal Republic (CFR) was conferred on him by President Muhammadu Buhari.
