= First Lady of Kaduna State =

- Incumbent; Hafsat Uba Sani since 29 May 2023
- Style: Her Excellency
- Residence: Kaduna State Government House
- Website: www.kdsg.gov.ng

The first lady of Kaduna State is an advisor to the Kaduna State governor, and often plays a role in social activism. The position is traditionally held by the wife of the governor of Kaduna State, concurrent with his term of office, although the Constitution of Nigeria does not recognize the office of the first lady. The current first lady is Hafsat Uba Sani.

== First ladies ==
The current first lady of Kaduna state who is the spouse of the governor is incumbent since 29 May 2023 and she is Hafsat Uba Sani. At present, there are five living former first ladies since 1999 when democratic rule was restored in Nigeria: Hajiya Asma'u Muhammad Makarfi (1999–2007), Hajiya Amina Namadi Sambo (2007–2010), Mrs Patrick Yakowa (2010–2012), Hajiya Fatima Ramalan Yero (2012–2015), Hajiya Hadiza Isma El-Rufai (2015–2023).
