= 1991 Kaduna State gubernatorial election =

1991 gubernatorial election in Kaduna State, Nigeria

- December 14, 1991
Nominee	Mohammed Dabo Lere	Ango Abdullahi
Party	National Republican Convention	SDP
Running mate	James Bawa Magaji
Governor before election
Abubakar Tanko Ayuba
Nigerian military junta
Elected Governor
Mohammed Dabo Lere
National Republican Convention

The 1991 Kaduna State gubernatorial election occurred on December 14, 1991. NRC's Mohammed Dabo Lere won election for a first term, defeating SDP's Ango Abdullahi.

Mohammed Dabo Lere emerged party candidate in the NRC gubernatorial primary. He picked James Bawa Magaji as his running mate. Ango Abdullahi was the SDP candidate.

== Electoral system ==
The Governor of Kaduna State is elected using the plurality voting system.

== Primary election ==
=== NRC primary ===
The NRC primary election produced Mohammed Dabo Lere as the party's candidate.

=== Candidates ===
- Party nominee: Mohammed Dabo Lere: Winner.
- Running mate: James Bawa Magaji.

=== SDP primary ===
The SDP primary election was contested by Professor Ango Abdullahi and Barr. Adamu Audu Maikori. Abdullahi won the primary run-off election polling 166,857 votes (59.7%) while his closest rival, Maikori, scored 67,312 votes (21%).

=== Candidates ===
- Party nominee: Ango Abdullahi.
- Running mate: .
- Adamu Maikori

== Results ==
There were only two political parties allowed by law, NRC and SDP. NRC candidate Mohammed Dabo Lere won election for a first term, defeating SDP's Ango Abdullahi.

Candidate	Party
Mohammed Dabo Lere	National Republican Convention (NRC)
Ango Abdullahi	Social Democratic Party (SDP)
Total
