= Samaila Suleiman =

Nigerian politician (born 1981)

Member of the House of Representatives of Nigeria from Kaduna
- In office 9 June 2015 – 11 June 2023
- Preceded by: Usman Shehu Bawa
- Succeeded by: Mohammed Bello El-Rufai
- Constituency: Kaduna North

Chairman of Kaduna North Local Government
- In office 5 December 2012 – 2 December 2014
- Succeeded by: Ahmed Kurfi

Personal details
- Born: 3 February 1981 (age 45) Kaduna State, Nigeria
- Party: Peoples Democratic Party (2022–present)
- Other political affiliations: Congress for Progressive Change (2010–2013); All Progressives Congress (2013–2022)
- Spouses: Faiza Samaila Suleiman; Maryam Samaila Suleiman (m. 2016)
- Children: 2
- Parents: Abdu Suleiman (father); Maryam Sani Sambo (mother)
- Education: Abubakar Tafawa Balewa University; Ahmadu Bello University
- Occupation: Politician

Samaila Suleiman (born 3 February 1981) is a Nigerian politician who served as a member of the House of Representatives of Nigeria representing Kaduna North Federal Constituency of Kaduna State from 2015 to 2023. He was elected under the All Progressives Congress platform in March 2015. In March 2022, he resigned from the ruling APC to the Peoples Democratic Party after an interest of Governor Nasir El-Rufai's son, Bello, on his seat in the green chamber.

== Early life and education ==
Samaila Suleiman was born in Kaduna State, Nigeria, on 3 February 1981 into a Hausa political dynasty. Suleiman is a son of Alhaji Abdu Suleiman who was an elder statesmen and a prominent politician. His father was considered by many as a highly influential person that takes part in most political decisions in Kaduna State.

Suleiman attended Kaduna Capital School where he obtained his primary education from 1988 to 1993 and secondary education from 1994 to 1999. He was admitted into the Abubakar Tafawa Balewa University, Bauchi, where he obtained a bachelor's degree in mechanical engineering in 2004 and later Ahmadu Bello University, Zaria for a master's degree in International Affairs & Diplomacy from 2008 to 2009.

== Civil career ==
Having successfully obtained his bachelor's degree in mechanical engineering in 2004, Suleiman moved to work with Kaduna Refinery between 2005 and 2006, and later did a transfer of service to Nigeria LNG from 2007 to 2008, and then Energy Commission of Nigeria from 2009 to 2010 and later resigned to join politics.

== Political career ==
Suleiman was first elected into the public office as a local government chairman from Kaduna North in Kaduna State under the defunct Congress for Progressive Change (CPC) in 2012. He was the only politician to have won local government election under the CPC having shared the same constituency with the then vice president of Nigeria from the then ruling party People's Democratic Party (PDP).

In 2015, Suleiman was first elected into the House of Representatives of Nigeria. He replaced the immediate past Deputy Minority Whip of the House, Hon. Garba Mohammed Datti to become the 8th National Assembly's 2nd Chairman of the House Committee on Solid Minerals after his rejection of the chairmanship of the committee offered to him by the Speaker Yakubu Dogara's led administration.
