= Osondu =

Osondu is a Nigerian surname. Notable people with the name include:

- Philip Osondu (born 1971), Nigerian footballer
- E. C. Osondu, Nigerian writer
- Chidi Osondu, Nigerian-American record producer and songwriter
- Christopher Osondu, Nigerian Navy officer
