= Executive Council of Kaduna State =

The Kaduna State Executive Council (also known as the Cabinet of Kaduna State) is the highest formal governmental body that plays important roles in the Government of Kaduna State headed by the Governor of Kaduna State. It consists of the Deputy Governor, Secretary to the State Government, Head of Service, aides, and Commissioners who preside over ministerial departments.

== Functions ==
The Executive Council exists to advise and direct the Governor. Their appointment as members of the Executive Council gives them the authority to execute power over their fields.

== Current cabinet ==
The current Executive Council is serving under the Uba Sani administration.

=== Principal Officers and administration ===
Office	Incumbent
Governor	Uba Sani
Deputy Governor	Hadiza Sabuwa Balarabe
Secretary to the State Government	Dr. Abdulkadir Meyere
Head of Service	Jummai Bako
Senior Honorary Advisor	Dr. Yusuf Hamisu Abdubakar (Mai Rago)
Chief of Staff	Sani Liman
Deputy Chief of Staff for the Deputy Governor	
Deputy Chief of Staff for Legal and Legislative Matters	Mustapha Musa
Deputy Chief of Staff for Support Services	Abubarak Haruna
Deputy Chief of Staff for Administration	Umar Hassan Waziri
Principal Private Secretary	Prof. Bello Ayuba
Special Adviser on Social Investment Program	Bridget A.O. Sulaiman
Special Adviser on Human Capital Development	Sagir Balarabe Musa
Special Adviser on Investment and Promotion	Sabiu Sani
Special Adviser on Chieftaincy Matters	Mukthar Ibrahim
Chief Press Secretary	Mohammed Lawal Shehu
Special Adviser on Programme Monitoring and Evaluation	Mary Adeola Olarerin
Special Adviser on Project Implementation and Result Delivery	Prof. Mahmud Sodangi
Special Adviser on Research and Documentation	Fabian Okoye
Special Adviser on Stakeholder Relations	Abdul Ishaq
Special Adviser on Peace and Conflict	Atiku Sankey
Special Adviser on Economic Matters	Ibrahim T. Muhammad
Special Adviser on Energy	Abdulkareem Mayere
Counselor on Political Affairs	Dr Shehu Usman Muhammad
Counselor on Land Matters	Bulus Banquo Audu
Counselor on Infrastructure	Samaila Suleiman

=== Commissioners and Agency Heads ===
Office	Incumbent
Attorney-General and Commissioner of Justice	Sule Shuaibu
Commissioner of Agriculture	Murtala Mohammed Dabo
Commissioner of Business, Innovation & Technology	Patience Fakai
Commissioner of Education	Prof. Muhammad Sani Bello
Commissioner of Environment and Natural Resources	Abubakar Buba
Commissioner of Finance	Shizzer Joy Nasara Bada
Commissioner of Health	Umma Kaltume Ahmed
Commissioner of Housing and Urban Development	Aminu Abdullahi Shagali
Commissioner of Human Services and Social Development	Salisu Rabi
Commissioner of Internal Security and Home Affairs	Sir James A. Kanyip
Commissioner of Local Government Affairs	Sadiq Mamman Lagos
Commissioner of the Planning and Budget Commission	Mukthar Ahmed Monrovia
Commissioner of Public Works and Infrastructure	Ibrahim Hamza
Commissioner of Sports Development	Prof. Benjamin Kumai Gugong
Director-General of the Kaduna Geographic Information Service	Dr. Bashir Garba Ibrahim
Executive Chairman of the Kaduna Internal Revenue Service	Jerry Adams
Ag. Executive Secretary of the Kaduna Investment Promotion Agency (KADIPA)	Sadiq Mohammed
Executive Secretary of the Kaduna State Pension Bureau	Salamatu I. Isah
Executive Secretary of the Kaduna State Social Investment Programme Agency (KADSIPA)/ State Coordinator N-SIP	Umar Sani Mailkudi
