= 1983 Kaduna State gubernatorial election =

1983 gubernatorial election in Kaduna State, Nigeria

- August 13, 1983
Nominee	Lawal Kaita
Party	NPN	UPN
Governor before election
Abba Musa Rimi (Acting governor)
PRP
Elected Governor
Lawal Kaita
NPN

The 1983 Kaduna State gubernatorial election occurred on August 13, 1983, and was an election in the Kaduna state of Nigeria. NPN's Lawal Kaita won election for a first term, defeating main opposition Unity Party of Nigeria and other party candidates in the contest.

== Electoral system ==
The Governor of Kaduna State is elected using the plurality voting system.

== Results ==
Lawal Kaita of the NPN won the election, beating out the candidate from the Unity Party of Nigeria.

Candidate	Party
Lawal Kaita	National Party of Nigeria (NPN)
Unity Party of Nigeria (UPN)	
Total
