= Ango Sadiq Abdullahi =

Nigerian politician

Member of the House of Representatives of Nigeria from Kaduna
- Incumbent
- Assumed office June 2023
- Constituency: Sabon Gari

Personal details
- Born: 7 July 1983 (age 42)
- Citizenship: Nigeria

Ango Sadiq Abdullahi (born 7 July 1983) is a Nigerian politician. He currently serves as a member representing Sabon Gari in the House of Representatives.

== Early life and education ==
Ango Sadiq Abdullahi was born on 7 July 1983 and hails from Kaduna State, Nigeria. He attended a Nigerian university, where he earned a Bachelor of Science (B.Sc.) degree in Political Science. His academic background laid the foundation for his interest and involvement in politics and public service. He is the son of Prof. Ango Abdullahi, an elder statesman and academic.

== Political career ==
In 2023, Sadiq contested and won the House of Representatives elections under the Peoples Democratic Party (PDP), defeating his rival Hon. Mohammed Garba Datti of the All Progressives Congress (APC).

== Abduction ==
He was abducted by bandits on 28 March 2022 together with 61 other persons on an Kaduna-Abuja- train. He achieved his victory in the PDP primaries while still in captivity, but was eventually released after some negotiations to join his family and received psychological treatment at a private hospital in Kaduna.
