= Abubakar Tanko Ayuba =

Nigerian politician (1945–2016)

Major General Abubakar Tanko Ayuba

National Senator
- In office May 2007 – May 2011
- Preceded by: Usman Sanni Sami
- Succeeded by: Mohammed Magoro
- Constituency: Kebbi South

Governor of Kaduna State
- In office August 1990 – 2 January 1992
- Deputy: Aisha Pamela Sadauki
- Preceded by: Abdullahi Sarki Mukhtar
- Succeeded by: Mohammed Dabo Lere

Personal details
- Born: 12 April 1945 Zuru, Sokoto State
- Died: 25 May 2016 (aged 70) Lagos, Nigeria
- Party: All Progressives Congress
- Profession: Military officer; politician

Military service
- Allegiance: Nigeria
- Branch: Nigerian Army
- Rank: Major General
- Commands: Signal Corps

Abubakar Tanko Ayuba (12 April 1945 – 25 May 2016) was a Nigerian politician who was elected senator for the Kebbi South constituency in Kebbi State, Nigeria in April 2007.

== Background ==
Abubakar Ayuba was born on April 12th, 1945. He attended the Nigerian Military School, Zaria. He was commissioned as an officer in the 1st Short Service Course at the Nigerian Defence Academy, Kaduna in 1967. Later, Ayuba attended the Armed Forces Command and Staff College, Jaji from 1978-1979, and the MNI National Institute for Policy & Strategic Studies, Kuru in 1988. In the army, he was commander of the Corps of Signals from 1984-1985, and a major general. Under military rule he was appointed Minister of Communications, military governor of Kaduna State, Chief of Administration and Chief of Policy and Plans. He was appointed governor of Kaduna State in August 1990 during the military regime of General Ibrahim Babangida, handing over to the elected civilian governor Mohammed Dabo Lere in January 1992 at the start of the abortive Nigerian Third Republic.

== Senate career ==
Ayuba was elected on the People's Democratic Party (PDP) platform in April 2007. He was appointed to committees on Science & Technology, Police Affairs, Navy, National Planning, Integration and Cooperation, Defence & Army and Communications.

In January 2008, Leadership paper reported that Ayuba was one of the first senators to have his election nullified, but that he was appealing the decision.

In September 2008, he was awarded the prestigious 'Nelson Mandela Gold Award' for his excellent leadership and contributions to society.

== Death ==
Ayuba died on 26 May 2016 at 5:05pm on Wednesday at the age of 71 at Lagos State University Teaching Hospital following a long illness. He was buried next day at his home at Dirin-Daji in Sakaba.
