= Hamman Bello =

Nigerian customs officer (1949–2022)

Hamman Bello Ahmed OFR

Comptroller General of the Nigeria Customs Service
- In office 27 May 2008 – 14 January 2009
- Preceded by: Jacob Gyang Buba, OFR
- Succeeded by: Bernard Shaw Nwadialo

Personal details
- Born: 3 January 1949 Jada, Adamawa State, Nigeria
- Died: 26 January 2022 (aged 73)
- Education: Ahmadu Bello University

Hamman Bello Ahmed (also referred to in sources as Hamman Bello Ahmed Kojoli and Hamman Kojoli), OFR (3 January 1949 – 26 January 2022), was a Nigerian customs officer, philanthropist and politician. He served as the Comptroller General (CG) of the Nigeria Customs Service from 2008 to 2009 by Umaru Yar Adua. He was replaced by B. E. Nwadialo; prior to becoming the CG of Customs, he has been the assistant CG of Customs at the Abuja headquarters.

== Background ==
Ahmed was born and raised in Kojoli Village in the Jada local government area of Adamawa, Nigeria.

Ahmed began his early education at the Jada Primary School from 1956 to 1963, then attended the Government Secondary School Ganye for his secondary education from 1965 to 1969. He obtained his WASC at the Government Secondary School Bauchi in 1970. He attended Ahmadu Bello University in 1977, where he obtained his B.A. Hons and did his National Youth Service Corps (NYSC) program in 1978.

== Career ==
Ahmed joined the Nigerian Customs Service as an assistant superintendent after graduating and serving his NYSC in 1978. He served and commanded multiple branches, including the Valuation Unit, Customs Headquarters, and Tin Can Island. He was then promoted to Assistant CG in 2005 and was the inspection officer of the Inspectorate Unit at the Customs Headquarters until May 2008, after which he was appointed Comptroller General.

== As comptroller ==
In 2008, he banned Nigeria Customs officials from setting checkpoints outside of border security areas, before which he established an anti-smuggling patrol.

== Other contributions ==
Before his career in Customs, Ahmed was instrumental in bringing rural electrification and communication infrastructure to communities in Jada.

== Personal life ==
Ahmed died on 26 January 2022 at the age of 74.
