= Mohammed Dabo Lere =

Nigerian politician (1940–2002)

Governor of Kaduna State
- In office 2 January 1992 – 17 November 1993
- Deputy: James Bawa Magaji
- Preceded by: Tanko Ayuba
- Succeeded by: Lawal Jafaru Isa

Personal details
- Born: 15 March 1940 Lere, Northern Region, British Nigeria (now in Kaduna State, Nigeria)
- Died: 18 February 2002 (aged 61)
- Party: National Republican Convention (1991–1993)
- Occupation: Politician

Alhaji Mohammed Dabo Lere (15 March 1940 – 18 February 2002) was a Nigerian politician who served as the governor of Kaduna State from January 1992 to November 1993 during the Nigerian Third Republic, leaving office after the military coup that brought General Sani Abacha to power.

== Early life ==
Dabo Lere was of Hausa-Fulani origin. He was born into the Lere royal family on 15 March 1940 in Lere town present-day Kaduna State.

== Governor of Kaduna State ==
Dabo Lere was elected governor of Kaduna State in December 1991 on the National Republican Convention (NRC) platform, with James Bawa Magaji as his running mate.

In February 1992, there was violence between the mainly Muslim Hausa and mainly Christian Kataf communities of the Zangon-Kataf Local Government Area, with over 60 people killed. Dabo Lere set up a 7-person judicial committee to investigate the crisis, but neither side was satisfied.

On 15 May 1992, there was a further outbreak of violence in Zangon-Kataf, and after news spread to Kaduna, there was further violence in reprisal from both sides. Dabo Lere eventually made a broadcast at 7 p.m. on 17 May, calling for a curfew, which was ignored.

After four days, calm returned when President Ibrahim Babangida ordered a dusk-to-dawn curfew and rushed in army troops and riot police from other states.

In 2001, Dabo Lere led the supporters of Ibrahim Babangida in the North.

== Death ==
Dabo Lere died of a stroke in Abuja on 18 February 2002, aged 61.
