= Nigeria Customs Broadcasting Network =

Radio and television service of the Nigerian Customs Service

The Nigeria Customs Broadcasting Network (NCBN) is the media wing of the Nigerian Customs Service. Planned to operate radio and television stations in major cities across the country, it currently only broadcasts on radio (106.7 MHz FM) and television in Abuja.

In 2020, the NCS entered into a technical partnership with a private company to assist it in the development of FM radio and television services in each of the country's six geopolitical zones, with the goal of "rebranding the NCS, promoting business opportunities and increasing security awareness in Nigeria", per a spokesperson for the agency. Television and radio operations in Abuja and Lagos were listed as the highest priority.
