= Lawal Jafaru Isa =

Administrator of Kaduna State
- In office 9 December 1993 – 22 August 1996
- Preceded by: Mohammed Dabo Lere
- Succeeded by: Hammed Ali

Military service
- Allegiance: Nigeria
- Branch: Nigerian Army
- Rank: Brigadier General

Lawal Jafaru Isa is a retired Nigerian Army Brigadier General, and was the Military Administrator of Kaduna State from December 1993 to August 1996 during the military regime of General Sani Abacha. His administration initiated Not in Our Character, a public-information campaign developed through a national seminar, publication and television documentary. Isa convened the seminar and served as its chief host.

In 1996, Isa created several chiefdoms for the southern Zaria or Kaduna people in order to improve peace in Kaduna State.

In September 2000, he was a leading member of the newly formed Arewa Consultative Forum, a northern political lobbying group.

He became a leader of the United Nigerian Development Forum, an association friendly to the election of General Ibrahim Babangida in the April 2003 Presidential contest. He became a director of Bank PHB.

Ifeanyi Nwolisa wrote this about him: “I can’t actually remember all the past governors of Kaduna state, but there is a particular one that is my favorite –the then Lt Col. Lawal Jafaru Isa who governed Kaduna from December 1993 – September 1996. It was during his time that Kaduna was at its most volatile because we just had the Zongo Kataf riot in 1992. His quick interventions and good leadership instincts ensured that the crisis did not escalate.”

Nwolisa added, "I remember meeting the Lt. Colonel, as a boy's brigade then with the Anglican faith, in one of the synod meetings organized in St Michael’s Anglican Church. Lt Col. Lawal Jafaru Isa though a Muslim did not have a problem participating as a special guest of honor. That was good judgment because the move ensured that Christians began to trust him and had good faith in the government to defend all lives of the citizens irrespective of religious background. The good intention of Lt Col. Lawal Jafaru Isa in uniting all residents in the state created a model for subsequent governors to follow, which is to act with urgency in any occurrence of even the slightest of crisis."

== Political debacles ==
Isa, a staunch supporter of President Muhammadu Buhari of Nigeria, had contested for the governorship of his native Kano state twice since the return of democracy to Nigeria in 1999. First, he contested under Buhari's newly formed Congress for Progressive Change (CPC) in 2011 but was defeated by the intra-party squabbles with the son of Late Head of State General Sani Abacha, Alhaji Muhammad Abacha.

His second shot for power under the All Progressive Congress (APC) in 2015 didn't see the light of the day also after he was floored in the party's primary by the present governor of the state, Dr. Abdullahi Umar Ganduje.

== Corruption charges ==
In the two occasions Isa ran for gubernatorial elections, he premised his campaign on integrity. Many of his associates, including Yakubu Ya’u Isa, claimed he is as clean as Muhammadu Buhari whom some Nigerians tag Mr. Integrity.

But penultimate January 6, 2015, the Economic and Financial Crimes Commission (EFCC), picked him up in his Abuja residence in connection with the ongoing investigation into the disbursement of funds from the office of the former National Security Adviser.

Isa is the first chieftain of the APC to be arrested by the EFCC since the beginning of a probe into the alleged diversion of $2.1 billion meant for arms purchase by officials of the immediate-past administration of ex-president Goodluck Ebele Jonathan.

Isa is believed to be a close friend of the embattled former National Security Adviser (NSA), Col. Sambo Dasuki (Rtrd).

Isa's house was said to have been invaded by operatives of the EFCC around 9pm, and then whisked him away a few minutes later. A week before the retired brigadier general was arrested, an invitation was sent to him to appear before the commission on January 6 to clear the air on “some questionable receipts” from the former NSA. Investigators believe the retired soldier received over N100million from Col. Dasuki.

It was gathered that rather than honoring the invitation, sources said, Gen. Isa wrote a letter to the EFCC through his lawyer, seeking a postponement of his appearance date on the grounds of death of a relative. Apparently dissatisfied with his excuse, the EFCC however arrested him to clarify the "questionable receipts".

The founder of Daar Communications Plc., Chief Raymond Dokpesi was recently arrested for N2.1 billion traced to his accounts. He said the money he received from the office of the National Security Adviser during the administration of Goodluck Jonathan was payment for media and political campaign for the 2015 general election.

Alhaji Attahiru Bafarawa, the former governor of Sokoto, is also facing probe for N100 million he said collected for spiritual prayers towards the success of the People's Democratic Party (PDP) during the 2015 general elections. So also the former Minister of state for Finance, Bashir Yuguda, was arrested for allegedly receiving N1.5billion from the former NSA's office through an unnamed company, for unstated purpose.

Recently, the spokesman of the PDP, Chief Olisa Metuh was also invited by the EFCC to answer the source of some suspicious money to the accounts of a company he has large shares. A staff the EFCC who confirmed a company by the name Destra Investment limited which Metuh has large shares in, received money to the tune of N1.4 billion from the office of the National Security Adviser.

Others in detention include the son of Mr. Bafarawa, Sagir Bafarawa, and that of a former Minister of Defence, Bello Mohammed, Abba Mohammed.

The lists of Nigerians invited by the EFCC are rising by the day. The end of the probes doesn't seem to be here soon. Jafaru Isa, the first APC chieftain, has been added as another big fish in the EFCC net.
