= Andrew Jonathan Nok =

- Born: 11 February 1962; Kaduna State, Nigeria
- Died: 21 November 2017 (aged 55)
- Citizenship: Nigerian
- Occupations: Biochemist; Educationist; Researcher
- Years active: 1986-2017
- Known for: his discovery of the gene responsible for the synthesis of sialidase, an enzyme which causes sleeping sickness in humans (Human African Trypanosomiasis, HAT) and nagana in animals (Animal African Trypanosomiasis, AAT).

Andrew Jonathan Nok , NNOM (11 February 1962 – 21 November 2017) was a Nigerian Professor of Biochemistry and the Public Affairs Secretary of the Nigerian Academy of Science. In 2010 he was a recipient of the Nigerian National Order of Merit Award (NNOM), in the Science category and in 2013 he won the Alexander Humboldt Prize. He died on 21 November 2017 after a brief illness.

== Early life ==
Nok was born on 11 February 1962 in Kaduna State, Northern Nigeria. His parents were from Nok village in the Jaba Local Government Area of Kaduna State. He attended the LEA Primary School in Kaduna before he proceeded to Government Secondary School, Kafanchan where he obtained the West African School Certificate in 1979, the same year he was admitted into Ahmadu Bello University where he received a bachelor's degree in biochemistry in 1983, master's degree in 1988 and doctorate degree in 1993. He was married to Amina Nok and is a father of three children: Anita, Amanda and Nathan Nok.

== Political career ==
Nok was nominated as Commissioner of Health and Human services by the Executive Governor of Kaduna state, Mallam Nasir Ahmad el-Rufai on 29 July 2015, along with other 12 nominees.

== Fellowship ==
- Fellow, Nigerian Academy of Science
- Fellow, Alexander von Humboldt Foundation
- Fellow, Japan Society for the Promotion of Science
- Lady Davis Fellows
- Fellow, Nigerian Society of Biochemistry and Molecular Biology (NSBMB)
- Fellow, Nigerian Academy of Science (NAS)
