= Abdullahi Dikko =

Nigerian government official (1960–2021)

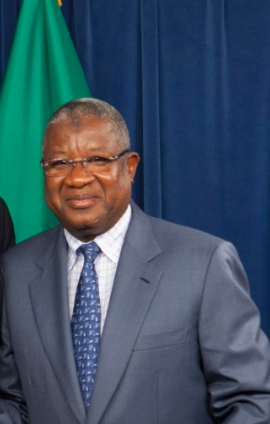
- Dikko Inde

Comptroller-General of Nigerian Customs Service
- In office 26 August 2009 – 17 August 2015
- Preceded by: Bernard Shaw Nwadialo
- Succeeded by: Hammed Ali

Personal details
- Born: 11 May 1960 Musawa, Katsina State, Nigeria
- Died: 18 February 2021 (aged 60) Abuja
- Party: Non-partisan

Military service
- Allegiance: Nigeria
- Branch/service: Nigeria Customs Service
- Years of service: 1987–2015

Abdullahi Dikko Inde CON, MFR (11 May 1960 – 18 February 2021) was a Nigerian government official who served as the comptroller-general of Nigerian Customs Service from August 2009 to August 2015.

== Life and career ==
Dikko was born on 11 May 1960, in Musawa town, Musawa local government area of Katsina State, in present-day North Western Nigeria. He is an Alumnus of Government College, Kaduna in 1974 where he obtained the West African Senior School Certificate Examination in 1980.

He went on to obtain a Bachelor of Science degree in economics and a Master of Science degree in finance. From the Dimitrov Apostle Tshenov University, in Svishtov, Bulgaria.

He enlisted in the Nigerian Customs Service in 1988 and went on to have a 27 year old career.

He served in various commands of the Nigeria Customs Service like the Seme Border, the Tincan Island Port, Apapa, Imo, Kaduna, and Badagry Area Commands, before being reposted to Investigation and Inspection Department at the Nigeria Customs Service Headquarters, in Abuja.

He was appointed Controller-General of Nigerian Customs Service on 26 August 2009, by the Government of President Umaru Musa Yaradua.

Dikko Inde went on to attain the Rank of Vice Chairman of the World Customs Organization during the tenure of Kunio Mikuriya, the Secretary General of the WCO.

== Death ==
After retired in 2015 at the age of 55 Dikko.

On February 18, 2021, he died of an undisclosed illness in Abuja, Nigeria, at the age of 60.

== Awards ==
He was a recipient of numerous awards, including:

- Member of The Federal republic, MFR awarded by the president of Federal Republic of Nigeria.
- Officer of the Federal Republic, OFR awarded by the president of the Federal Republic of Nigeria.
- Best Anti Smuggling Command of the year (2007) awarded by the National Council of Managing Directors of Licensed Customs Agents.
- International Freight Forwards Association Award of the Highest CAC Revenue Collector of the year (2007).
- Badagry Prime Award for Excellence (2007).
- Maritime Watch Outstanding Service Award (2007)
- Bold News Africa International Magazine's African Leadership Icon Merit Award (2008)
- African Leaders of Integrity Merit Award (2008).
- Africa Gold International Communications Award for Great African Patriotic Achievers (GAPAGA) (2008).
- African Age International Leadership Gold Award for Excellence.
- African Choice International News Magazine Award for Meritorious Award for Heroic Service, (2009).
- Transparent Monitoring Action's Award for Transparent Administrator of year (2009).
- Globalink International 2009 African International Role Model Leadership Gold Award for National Development.
- Sir Abubakar Tafawa Balewa Inspirational Leadership and Good Governance Award, (2009).
- Maritime Reporters Association of Nigeria's MARAN Award for the most outstanding Customs Administrator, (2009).
- National Association of Government Approval Freight Forwarder's (NAGAFF) Peace Award (2009).

== See also ==
- Nigerian Customs Service
