= Usman Shehu Bawa =

Nigerian politician

Usman Bawa

Member of the House of Representatives of Nigeria
- In office 3 June 2011 – 8 June 2015
- Succeeded by: Samaila Suleiman

Personal details
- Born: 17 April 1973 (age 53) Kaduna State, Nigeria
- Party: Peoples Democratic Party (PDP)
- Education: Ahmadu Bello University
- Occupation: Legislature
- Profession: Politician

Usman Shehu Bawa (born 17 April 1973), popularly known as Shehu ABG, is a Nigerian politician who was a member of the House of Representatives representing Kaduna North constituency. He is a member of the People's Democratic Party (PDP).

== Early life ==
Bawa was born in Nigeria's northern city of Kaduna. He is the son of Alhaji Bawa Garba, the founder of Nigeria's ABG Group. He started his primary education at the Kaduna Polytechnic staff school. He was later transferred to Kaduna Capital School, where he completed his early education. He began his secondary education at Sardauna Memorial College and later transferred to Essence International School, completing his secondary education in 1993. In 1999, Bawa completed a bachelor's degree in geography at Ahmadu Bello University in Zaria.

== Professional career ==
He started his early professional career working in his father's communications firm, ABG Communications. Later, he started a number of firms including GSM.COM Limited and Top desk International Limited. While GSM.COM Limited sought to exploit opportunities in the newly deregulated telecommunications industry in 2001, Top Desk International Limited was established as a business consultancy and procurement firm. Bawa later took a job as general manager of an agricultural firm – Agric Supermarket Limited, a business in which he was a co-founder. Following his decision to join active politics in 2011, Bawa resigned his positions in all the businesses.

== Political career ==
Bawa is a member of the leading opposition party All Progressives Congress (APC). He started his political career in the All Nigeria Peoples Party (ANPP) where he previously ran for the House of Representatives to represent Kaduna North Federal Constituency. He later joined former Head of State and leading opposition figure, General Muhammadu Buhari to form a new political party - the Congress for Progressive Change (CPC). It was on that platform that he successfully ran and won a seat at the lower chamber of the National Assembly in the 2011 general elections.

== Committee appointments ==
Bawa was appointed as deputy chairman, House of Representatives Committee on Communications. The committee has oversight responsibility for the Federal Ministry of Communications Technology and its subsidiary agencies including the Nigerian Communications Commission and Nigerian Postal Service. During the time he was acting Chairman of the Communications Committee in 2011, Bawa chaired the subcommittee that was set up to investigate the SIM Card Registration exercise superintended by the NCC. Usman has also been a member of several other committees, including Diaspora, Navy Banking & Currency, Gas Resources, Electoral Matters, Health, Legislative Compliance, and Solid Minerals Development.

== Awards and honours ==
Bawa was honoured by the APC in Kaduna on September 13, 2014, for showing "exemplary and visionary leadership". Zubairu Shu'una, one of the local leaders of the party in the constituency, presented the certificate of recognition to Bawa, describing him as someone "committed to the uplift of the people".
