= Bernard Shaw Nwadialo =

Nigerian customs officer

Comptroller-General of Nigerian Customs Service
- In office 15 January 2009 – 26 August 2009
- Preceded by: Hamman Bello
- Succeeded by: Abdullahi Dikko

Personal details
- Born: 16 August 1949 (age 76) Ogunta, Nigeria
- Education: University of Tennessee, University of Wisconsin Madison, University of Nigeria Nsukka
- Occupation: customs officer, lecturer

Military service
- Allegiance: Nigeria
- Branch/service: Nigeria Customs Service
- Years of service: 1995–2009
- Rank: Comptroller general
- Unit: Nigeria
- Commands: Nigerian Customs Service

Bernard Shaw Nwadialo (born August 16, 1949) was a Nigerian lecturer and customs officer appointed as the Comptroller-General of Nigerian Customs Service from January 2009 to August 2009 by Umaru Musa Yar'Adua, prior to being CGC, he was the deputy Comptroller-General of Custom. He was succeeded by Abdullahi Dikko.

He began his education in 1954 at Sacred Heart School, which he attended until 1959. He continued with his secondary school in 1960 to 1966 at the Holy Ghost College Owerri. From 1970 to 1973 he obtained his BSc from the University of Nigeria Nsukka for plant and soil science, and also attended the University of Wisconsin–Madison for his MSc from 1976 to 1978. He obtained his PhD of soil science in the University of Tennessee, Knoxville from 1978 to 1982.

== Career ==
Shaw returned to Nigeria and began his career as an assistant lecturer at the University of Nigeria Nsukka in 1982 and rose to be senior lecturer in 1988.

He joined the Nigeria Customs in 1995 as a deputy comptroller, later in 2000 he was made comptroller and in 2003 he served as the Customs Area Controller in Delta State command to 2004. He rose to become an Assistant Comptroller General in 2004 and was the chief in charge of Economic Relations, Research and Planning, Technical Services and Finance Administration, a position held prior to become a Deputy Comptroller-General of Customs in charge of Strategic Research and Policy.

== As custom boss ==
Serving as the CGC, he exonerated customs from the congestion at the ports after ordering importer to clear their goods, but most importers refuses. The then minister of Industry and Commerce, Theophilus Abah while speaking with journalist stated that the customs boss quoted that they the importers have been giving an unprecedented concession to come clear their goods. The importers were challenged on how is customs their problem after being given the concession on demurrage.
