= Hadiza Isma El-Rufai =

Nigerian novelist

Haj Hadiza Isma El-Rufai
- Born: 21 June 1960 (age 66); Kano, Kano State, Nigeria
- Other name: Hadiza Isma
- Education: Ahmadu Bello University, Bath Spa University
- Occupations: Architect novelist, politician
- Years active: 1999 to present
- Organization: Yasmin El-Rufai Foundation (YELF)
- Known for: Writer, philanthropist
- Notable work: An Abundance of Scorpions
- Spouse: Nasir el-Rufai

Hadiza Isma El-Rufai (born 21 June 1960) is a Nigerian writer (novelist), and wife to the former governor of Kaduna State, Mallam Nasir El-Rufai. She was the founder of Yasmin El-rufai Foundation (YELF), a non-profit literary organization. Her first novel is titled: "An Abundance of Scorpions".

== Biography ==
El-Rufai was born Hadiza Ismail in Kano, Nigeria, to Mohammed Musa Ismail and Amina Ismail. Her father was a civil servant.

== Career ==
She has a BSc and MSc in Architecture (1983) and an MBA (1992) from Ahmadu Bello University, Zaria, as well as a Masters in Creative Writing (2012) from Bath Spa University, United Kingdom.

From there, she worked as a lecturer at the Department of Architecture at Kaduna Polytechnic, a few more years at the National Electric Power Authority, before working in private practice.

She also speaks French language fluently.

== Family life ==
In 1985, she married Mallam Nasir El-Rufai whom she met in 1976 at the School of Basic Studies, Ahmadu Bello University, Zaria. He later became the Minister of the FCT in Nigeria, and the Governor of Kaduna State.

== Literary career ==
In 2017, El-Rufai published An Abundance of Scorpions (Ouida Books), a novel inspired by volunteer work the author did at an orphanage in Abuja, and her desire to write about an orphan. It was presented at the 2017 edition of the Aké Arts and Book Festival.

The work has been described by Helon Habila as "a heartbreaking tale of loss and an uplifting story of a woman's strength and determination".

== Philanthropy ==
Along with her husband, El-Rufai set up Yasmin El-Rufai Foundation (YELF) in 2013 to honour her daughter who died of an epileptic seizure in her flat in London in November 2011. The literary nonprofit was fully launched in 2017 with the aims of nurturing creativity in children, "particularly the girl child, between the ages of eight and 19" and young/adult women, providing them "resources with teachers and the books that they need to enhance their literacy."

As First Lady of Kaduna State, she has also used the office for philanthropic purposes to benefit the less privileged, donating drugs to sickle cell patients in Kaduna.

== Twitter comment controversy ==
In April 2020, El-Rufai, had responded on Twitter to a comment about her son using language with a threat of sexual violence against a critic during an argument on the social network with "Sow the wind, reap the whirlwind. All is fair in love and war." The remarks caused a lot of backlash on social media, including at Brittle Paper, a literary magazine, where an editorial disagreement between the editors about how to present the report led to the departure of the deputy editor. El-Rufai eventually apologised for her comment, saying she had misunderstood the earlier conflict and would "never condone sexual abuse in any shape or form" She later threatened to sue the group that accused her of condoning her son's sexual assault remarks.

== See also ==
- List of first ladies of Nigerian states
