= Hadiza Balarabe =

Nigerian politician (born 1966)

Her Excellency Hadiza
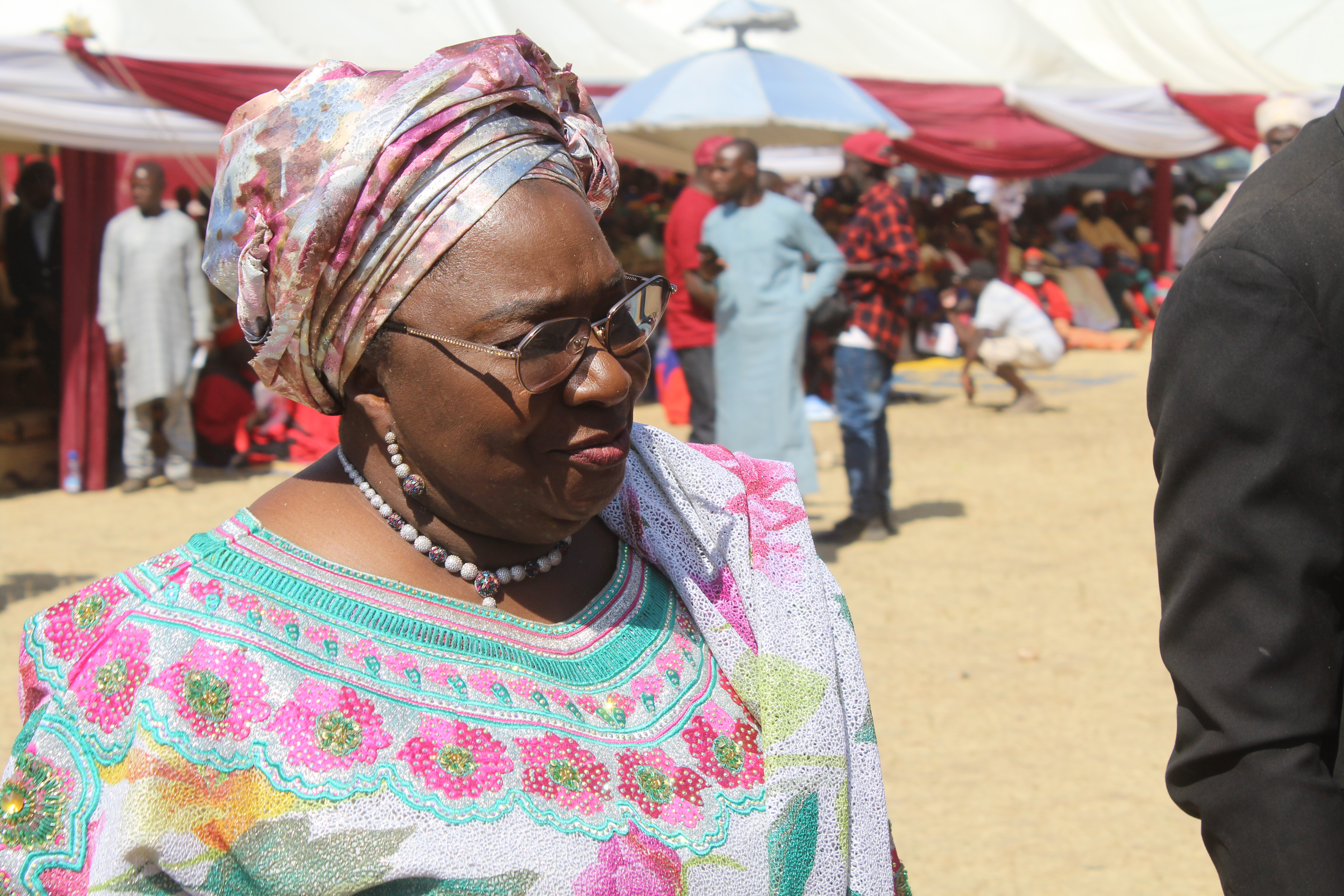
- Balarabe in January 2020

Deputy Governor of Kaduna State
- Incumbent
- Assumed office 29 May 2019
- Governor: Nasir el-Rufai (2019–2023); Uba Sani (since 2023)
- Preceded by: Barnabas Bala

Personal details
- Born: Hadiza Sabuwa Balarabe; 26 August 1966 (age 60) Sanga, Northern Region (now in Kaduna State), Nigeria
- Party: All Progressive Congress
- Education: University of Maiduguri
- Occupation: Politician; medical doctor

Hadiza Sabuwa Balarabe (born 26 August 1966) is a Nigerian politician and medical doctor who has served as the deputy governor of Kaduna State since 2019. She is the first female deputy governor of the state under the Democratic governance and was elected during the 2019 Nigerian gubernatorial elections held in March, under the platform of the ruling All Progressives Congress and re-elected in 2023.

== Early life and education ==
Balarabe was born into the family of Alhaji Abubakar Balarabe in Sanga local government area of Kaduna state. She attended Demonstration Primary School, Kagoro, Kaduna State in 1977 where she obtained first leaving school certificate.

She proceeded to Government Girls Secondary School Soba, now known as Government Girls Science Secondary School Soba for her secondary education and obtain her General Certificate of Education (GCE) in 1982, She then got admission into the prestigious University of Maiduguri to study medicine and graduated with MBBS in 1986. She is a Muslim.

== Political Career ==
On 15 October 2019, as acting governor, she presented the Kaduna State Government's 2020 Budget of Renewal to the Kaduna State House of Assembly, thereby becoming the first woman to do so in Northern Nigeria.

In 2022, she nursed the ambition of contesting for the position of governor during the 2023 general election but withdrew and was picked as a running mate to the All Progressives Congress, APC consensus candidate, Senator Uba Sani.. In March 2023, she was re-elected deputy governor.

== Awards and Honour ==
African leaders and innovators honoured Balarabe with the EWAH Afro Award 2024.
