= Aisha Pamela Sadauki =

Nigerian politician

Deputy Governor of Kaduna State
- In office August 1990 – 2 January 1992

Personal details
- Born: Aisha Pamela Sadauki; 1945 (age 80–81) Kaduna State, Nigeria
- Education: Iowa State University

Aisha Pamela Sadauki is a Nigerian politician who was a commissioner and deputy governor of Kaduna State under military governor Abubakar Tanko Ayuba.

== Background ==
Pamela Sadauki was born in 1945. She attended St-Louis Catholic mission school in Kano and earned a bachelor's degree in Home Economics with a Major in Nutrition from Iowa State University in 1968. She was appointed deputy governor of Kaduna State in August 1990 during the military regime of General Ibrahim Babangida. She was previously appointed Commissioner in Kaduna State, Community Development, Youth and Sports in 1988, Commissioner for Education in 1989 and Deputy Governor of Kaduna from 1990 to 1992.

== Personal life ==
Aisha Pamela Sadauki was married to former Nigerian minister, David Ahmed Sadauki, who died in 2008.

== Awards ==
The Farmers Veterinary Association of Nigeria awarded her the Medal of Honor in 1999. She received the National Honorary Medal of Officer of the Order of Nigeria (OON) in 2000.
