= Nigeria Customs Service =

Nigerian government agency

Agency overview
- Formed: 1891; 135 years ago
- Jurisdiction: Federal Ministry of Finance (Nigeria)
- Headquarters: No 2, Lake Taal Close, Tigris Crescent, Aguiyi Ironsi, Maitama, Abuja, FCT
- Employees: 18,000
- Agency executive: Bashir Adewale Adeniyi, Comptroller General
- Website: customs.gov.ng

The Nigeria Customs Service (NCS) is an agency of the Federal Republic of Nigeria, which operates as an independent customs service under the supervisory oversight of the Nigerian Ministry of Finance, responsible for the collection of customs revenue, facilitation of both national and international trade, anti-smuggling and border security activities, with its headquarters at No 2. Lake Taal Close, off Tigris Crescent, off Aguiyi Ironsi St, Maitama, Abuja.

== Organizational structure ==
The NCS is headed by the Comptroller General, who oversees the work of 9 Deputy Comptrollers-General (DCGs) in the following departments at the NCS Headquarters.

- Finance and Technical Service.
- Tariff & Trade.
- ICT & Modernization
- Legal Department
- Training and Doctrine Command (TRADOC).
- Enforcement, Investigation, and Inspection.
- Strategic Research and Policy.
- Excise, Industrial Incentives and Free Trade Zone.
- Human Resource Development.

These Deputy Comptrollers-General have Assistant Comptrollers-General heading each division under them while Comptrollers runs the affair of each unit under these divisions.

ACG (Headquarters) reports directly to the Comptroller-General along with the heads of some Special Units in addition to 4 Assistant Comptroller-General (ACG) in the zones that coordinate the area commands under their respective jurisdictions.

== Board ==
The NCS board is chaired by the Minister of Finance, while the Vice-Chairman is the Comptroller-General. The Board was set up with main functions to include Appointment, Promotion and Discipline of officers of the service. The Board is also to administer the Nigeria Customs Service Act, 2023. It is the policy making organ of the service.

Members of the NCS Board include:

- Minister of Finance (Chairman)
- The Comptroller General of Customs (Deputy Chairman)
- A representative from Fed. Min. of Commerce
- A representative of Ministry of Transport
- A representative of Ministry of Industries
- A representative of Ministry of Trade and Investment
- A representative of Ministry of Aviation
- A representative of Ministry of Foreign Affairs

Chairman, Federal Inland Revenue Service

- 2 Members representing the organized private sector for a term 4 years
- Serving DCGs of Customs
- The Legal Adviser of NCS
- Secretary From the Service

== Media network ==
The Nigeria Customs Service operates a media division with radio and television operations, the Nigeria Customs Broadcasting Network.

== Reputation ==
The Nigerian government claims that the service in recent times has redeemed its image from a corruption riddled government agency to a new organization, that has cleaned itself of corrupt practices pointing to the fact that since the year 2017 its revenue contribution to the country continue to rise above one trillion Naira annually.

Despite the claims of the government that the reputation of the service has improved from a corrupt government agency to an agency that has imbibed the spirit of selflessness to the country over self-enrichment of its officers, several examples of extensive bribery and corruption allegations still exist.

One example (cited by the government) of an incidence that demonstrated a new customs service was the rejection of the sum of $415,000 bribe by an official of the service Bashir Abubakar, being the money offered to him in order to facilitate the release of containers of dangerous drugs [tramadol] at Apapa Port in Lagos.

The Nigeria Customs Service is known to have a reputation that has been marred by numerous corruption and fraud scandals across the years. According to Transparency International's 2010 Global Corruption Barometer, more than half of local households surveyed attested to paying bribes to NCS officers in 2009.

To date, compromised staff, complex regulations and bureaucracy surrounding the import and export of goods has nurtured an environment in which bribes are commonly paid. Several companies are also believed to undervalue their goods upon importation to avoid penalties. Yet other companies, operating in the informal economy, resort to smuggling as a means of avoiding legal trade.

Notably, a number of foreign companies have been involved in fraud and corruption scandals in recent years:

- Three subsidiaries of Vetco International – Vetco Gray Controls Inc, Vetco Gray Controls Ltd and Vetco Gray UK Ltd – pleaded guilty to violating anti-bribery provisions of the Foreign Corrupt Practices Act (FCPA) when they admitted to making US$2.1 million worth of corrupt payments over a two-year period to officers in the NCS through Panalpina, a Swiss-based freight forwarding firm in Nigeria.
- At the same time as the subsidiaries were charged, another Vetco subsidiary – Aibel International Ltd – entered into a deferred prosecution agreement with the US Department of Justice for its involvement in the same scandal. This deferred prosecution agreement entailed co-operation with the Department of Justice, stricter controls and the retention of FCPA monitors. Subsequently, however, the company admitted to failing to comply with its obligations and paid a monetary fine.
- Oil services firm Transocean Ltd made corrupt payments to the value of US$90,000 to Nigerian customs officials between 2002 and 2007 to extend its importation status and receive false paperwork.
- Tidewater Inc., an oil service firm, paid US$1.6 million through Panalpina to Nigerian customs officials to clear vessels into Nigerian waters.
- Noble Energy authorized payments by its local subsidiary to obtain eight temporary permits. In November 2011, Noble, Transocean and Tidewater were three of the companies that settled allegations of involvement in a US$100 million bribery scheme in Nigeria, as part of the Panalpina settlements.
- Royal Dutch Shell entered into a U.S. plea deal in November 2010 over its contractor's involvement in bribing Nigerian customs officials. US authorities accused Shell's subsidiary Shell Nigerian Exploration and Production Co Ltd. of bribing Nigerian customs officials US$3.5 million to quickly process needed equipment for its offshore Bonga field. A heavy fine was levied on Shell after Panalpina, which was also employed by Shell, agreed to plead guilty to taking bribes on behalf of its clients.

In addition to legal cases involving the Foreign Corrupt Practices Act (FCPA), many Nigerian businesspeople face everyday situations where customs officials ask for bribes to let their goods pass through customs smoothly. On the other hand, some customs officials may even demand bribes to allow illegal goods to be smuggled in:

- On 27 February 2024, Premium Times revealed a multi-billion-naira corruption scandal within the Nigerian Customs Service (NCS). High-ranking NCS officials allegedly accepted bribes from smugglers operating along the Nigeria-Niger border. Despite the Economic and Financial Crimes Commission, EFCC detaining seven officers and recovering millions in suspected bribe money, none have been prosecuted, and all have returned to their duties.
- Similarly on 28 February 2024, Foundation for Investigative Journalism (FIJ) released a scathing exposé alleging that corrupt officials within the Nigeria Customs Service (NCS) hierarchy are facilitating smuggling operations for Ibrahim Egungbohun Dende in Ilaoro, southwest Nigeria.

Despite the detailed allegations, the NCS has yet to respond, and this has led many activists to call for far-reaching reforms that would place corruption at the back seat and seal up revenue leakages.

== Directors and comptroller-general past and present ==
- Shehu Ahmadu Musa, as director of NCS 1978–1979
- Jacob Gyang Buba, as Comptroller-General, 2004- May 2008
- Hamman Bello, as Comptroller-General, May 2008- January 2009
- Bernard Shaw Nwadialo, as Comptroller-General January 2009- August 2009
- Abdullahi Dikko, as Comptroller-General 2009–2015
- Hameed Ali, as Comptroller-General 2015–2023
- Bashir Adewale Adeniyi, as Comptroller General 2023–present
