= 1999 Kaduna State gubernatorial election =

1999 gubernatorial election in Kaduna State, Nigeria

- (Nigeria)
- January 9, 1999
Nominee	Ahmed Makarfi	Suleiman Zuntu
Party	PDP	All People's Party (Nigeria)
Running mate	Stephen Rijo Shekari	Adamu Ahmed Chitumu
Popular vote	844,525	512,544
Governor before election
Umar Farouk Ahmed
Nigerian military junta
Elected Governor
Ahmed Makarfi
PDP

The 1999 Kaduna State gubernatorial election occurred on January 9, 1999. Ahmed Makarfi of the PDP defeated Suleiman Zuntu of the APP and Wakili Kadima of AD to come winner in the elections.

Ahmed Makarfi emerged winner in the PDP gubernatorial primary election. His running mate was Stephen Rijo Shekari.

== Electoral system ==
The Governor of Kaduna State is elected using the plurality voting system.

== Results ==
PDP's Ahmed Makarfi emerged winner in the contest.

The total number of registered voters in the state for the election was 2,536,702. However, 2,557,800 were previously issued voting cards in the state.

Candidate	Party	Votes	%
Ahmed Makarfi	People's Democratic Party (PDP)	844,525	54.81
Suleiman Zuntu	All People's Party (APP)	512,544	33.26
Wakili Kadima	Alliance for Democracy (AD)	183,728	11.92
Total		1,540,797	100.00
Registered voters/turnout		2,536,702	–
Source: Nigeria World, IFES
