= Jaba, Nigeria =

Jaba Ham
- LGA
- Interactive map of Jaba
- Country: Nigeria
- State: Kaduna State
- Headquarters: Kwain

Government
  - Sole Administrator: Nita Byack George

Area
  - Total: 531 km^{2} (205 sq mi)

Population (2006)
  - Total: 155,973
  - Density: 396.7/km^{2} (1,027/sq mi)
- Time zone: UTC+1 (WAT)
- ISO 3166 code: NG.KD.JA

Jaba is a Local Government Area in southern Kaduna State, Nigeria. It covers an area of 531 km^{2}. It is located close to the Jos Plateau region and Abuja in the central part of Nigeria in West Africa. The local government capital is in the town of Kwoi. The postal code of the area is 801. The Chairman of the local government oversees both economic and developmental activities in the area.

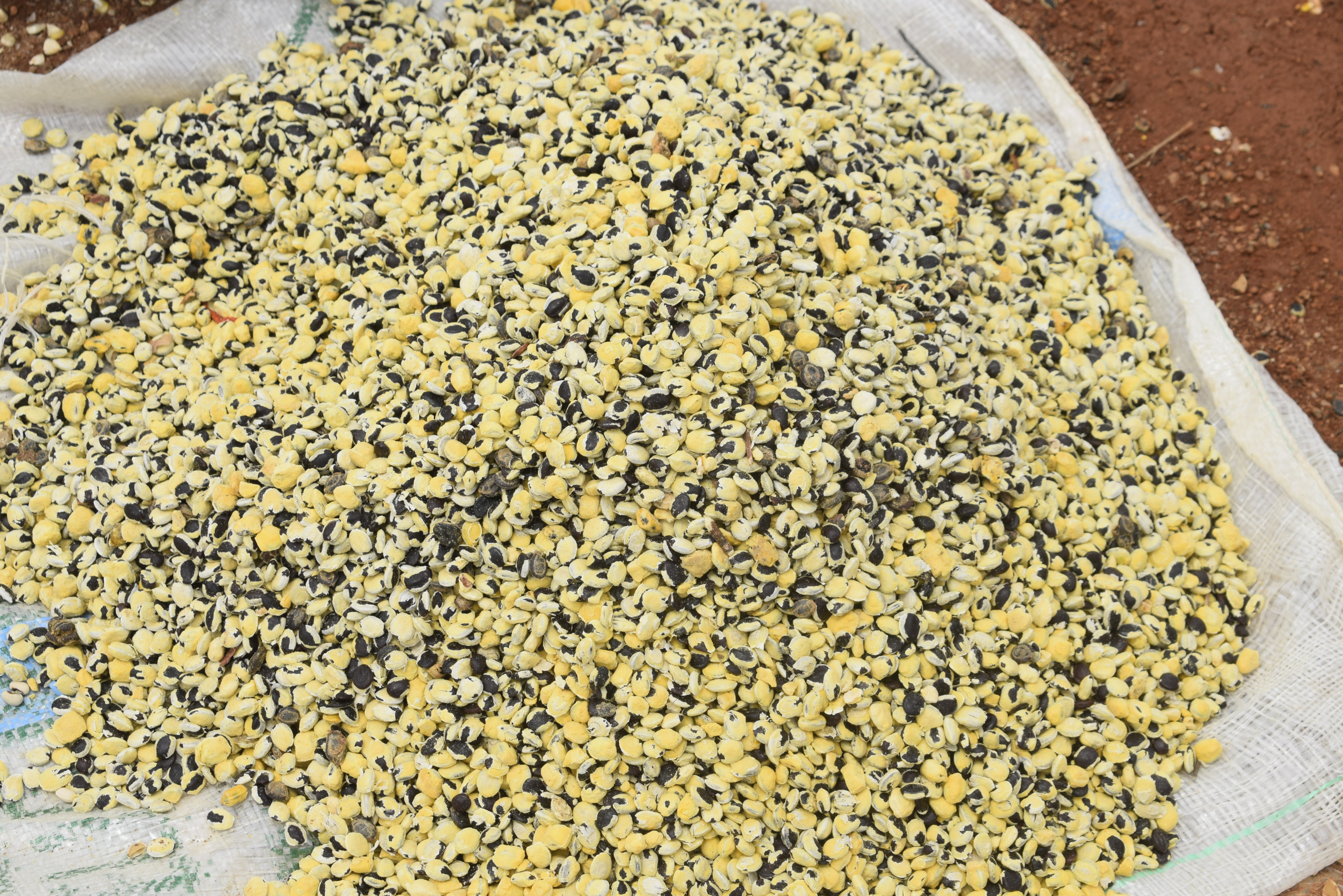
Locus bean

== Etymology ==
It is named after Jaba a local Hausa word used to describe the Ham people who occupy most of the local government.

== History ==
The Local Government was created on the 27th of August 1991. It was carved out from Jema'a Local Government Area. The local government is one of the old places in southern Kaduna, which the Jaba paramount chiefs since the colonial administration from 1910 till date.

== Geography ==
The Jaba local government area has an average temperature of 32 degrees Celsius or 89.6 degrees Fahrenheit and a total area of 368 square kilometres. The Local Government Area's average humidity is reported to be 34%, and the average wind speed in the region is 10 km/h (6.2 mph).

== Boundaries ==
Jaba Local Government Area (LGA) shares boundaries with Kachia LGA to the northwest, Kagarko LGA to the southwest, Zangon Kataf LGA to the north, Jema'a LGA to the east; and Karu LGA of Nasarawa State to south, respectively.

== Economy ==
Jaba is known for its unusual agricultural status as one of the world's top producing regions for ginger, with the sale and export of the commodity significantly boosting the local economy. Rams, goats, camels, and donkeys are just a few of the domestic animals that are raised and sold in the LGA. Hunting and trading are two other significant economic activities carried out by the residents of Jaba LGA. In 2023, an outbreak of a fungal disease destroyed much of the ginger crop in Jaba and neighbouring local government areas of southern Kaduna State, with about 95 per cent of the ginger grown in the state that year reported lost.

== Administrative subdivisions ==
Jaba Local Government Area consists of 10 subdivisions (second-order administrative divisions) or electoral wards, namely:

1. Chori (Kyoli) - consisting of Kyoli speakers
2. Daddu
3. Dura Bitaro
4. Fada
5. Fai
6. Nduya
7. Nok
8. Sabchem
9. Sabzuro
10. Samban

== Demographics ==
At the 2000 and 2006 census, there were 155,973 people in the local government area and a 2016 projection of 210,500. It is inhabited predominantly by Ham people, part of the people likely to have created the Nok culture.

The inhabitants are predominantly Christians.

== Infrastructure ==
=== Roads ===
From the Plateau State capital, Jos, it is a journey by road to Kafanchan to Sambang, Kwain, Nok, and to all other villages. From Kaduna, it is a journey through Kachia, Ngboodub, Ghikyaar and to Har Kwain.

== Education ==
There are a few administrative offices/agencies with educational institutions with the only higher institution being ECWA Pastors' Training College in Kwain (Kwoi).

== Notable people ==
- Ishaya Ibrahim, military personnel
- Adamu Maikori, lawyer, banker, politician
- Audu Maikori, lawyer, entrepreneur
- Yahaya Maikori, lawyer, entrepreneur
- Usman Mu'azu, military personnel
- Andrew Jonathan Nok, biochemist
