= 2007 Nigerian Senate elections in Kaduna State =

2007 Nigerian Senate election in Kaduna State

The 2007 Nigerian Senate election in Kaduna State was held on April 21, 2007, to elect members of the Nigerian Senate to represent Kaduna State. Mohammed Kabir Jibril representing Kaduna Central, Caleb Zagi representing Kaduna South and Ahmed Makarfi representing Kaduna North all won on the platform of the Peoples Democratic Party.

== Overview ==
Affiliation	Party		Total
Affiliation	PDP	AC	Total
Before Election			3
After Election	3	0	3

== Summary ==
District	Incumbent	Party	Elected Senator	Party
Kaduna Central			Mohammed Kabir Jibril	PDP
Kaduna South			Caleb Zagi	PDP
Kaduna North			Ahmed Makarfi	PDP

== Results ==
=== Kaduna Central ===
The election was won by Mohammed Kabir Jibril of the Peoples Democratic Party.

2007 Nigerian Senate election in Kaduna State
Party	Candidate	Votes	%
PDP	Mohammed Kabir Jibril		
Total votes			
PDP hold			

=== Kaduna South ===
The election was won by Caleb Zagi of the Peoples Democratic Party.

2007 Nigerian Senate election in Kaduna State
Party	Candidate	Votes	%
PDP	Caleb Zagi		
Total votes			
PDP hold			

=== Kaduna North ===
The election was won by Ahmed Makarfi of the Peoples Democratic Party.

2007 Nigerian Senate election in Kaduna State
Party	Candidate	Votes	%
PDP	Ahmed Makarfi		
Total votes			
PDP hold			
