= Christopher Osondu =

Nigerian politician and naval officer

Administrator of Cross River State
- In office August 1998 – May 1999
- Preceded by: Umar Farouk Ahmed
- Succeeded by: Donald Duke

Navy Captain Christopher Osondu was appointed Military Administrator of Cross River State, Nigeria in August 1998 during the transitional regime of General Abdulsalami Abubakar, handing over power to the elected civilian governor Donald Duke in May 1999. Shortly after, he was retired by the Federal Government, along with all other former military ministers, governors and administrators.

In November 2001, he was elected Vice Chairman (North) of the People's Democratic Party (PDP) in Abia State. In December 2002 he left the PDP. In the 2003 elections he was a senatorial candidate of the National Democratic Party (NDP) in Abia North.

== See also ==
- List of governors of Cross River State
