= 2003 Kaduna State gubernatorial election =

2003 gubernatorial election in Kaduna State, Nigeria

- (Nigeria)
- April 19, 2003
Nominee	Ahmed Makarfi	Suleiman Othman Hunkuyi
Party	PDP	ANPP
Running mate	Stephen Rijo Shekari
Popular vote	1,143,890	668,446
Governor before election
Ahmed Makarfi
PDP
Elected Governor
Ahmed Makarfi
PDP

The 2003 Kaduna State gubernatorial election occurred on April 19, 2003. Ahmed Makarfi of the PDP defeated five other candidates by polling 1,143,890 popular votes, ANPP's Suleiman Hunkuyi was closest contender with 668,446 votes.

Ahmed Makarfi defeated Samaila Yakawada and others at the PDP primary election to get the party's nomination. He retained Stephen Rijo Shekari as his running mate.

== Electoral system ==
The Governor of Kaduna State is elected using the plurality voting system.

== Results ==
A total of six candidates registered with the Independent National Electoral Commission to contest in the election. The PDP candidate won, defeating ANPP's Alh. Suleiman Hunkuyi, and four other minor party candidates.

The total number of registered voters in the state was 2,620,999. However, only about 77.02% (i.e. 2,018,689) of registered voters participated in the exercise.

Candidate	Party	Votes	%
Ahmed Makarfi	People's Democratic Party (PDP)	1,143,890	63.12
Suleiman Hunkuyi	All Nigeria Peoples Party (ANPP)	668,446	36.88
Joshua Madaki	Alliance for Democracy (AD)		
G. U. Basheer	United Nigeria People's Party (UNPP)		
Wakili Dhem Kadima	All Progressives Grand Alliance (APGA)		
Basheer Garba Umar	NCP		
Mataimaki Tom Maiyashi	PRP		
Total		1,812,336	100.00
Registered voters/turnout		2,620,999	–
Source: This Day, Dawodu
