= Umar Farouk Ahmed =

Military Administrator of Cross River State, Nigeria

Administrator of Cross River State
- In office August 1996 – August 1998
- Preceded by: Gregory Agboneni
- Succeeded by: Christopher Osondu

Administrator of Kaduna State
- In office August 1998 – May 1999
- Preceded by: Hammed Ali
- Succeeded by: Ahmed Mohammed Makarfi

Colonel Umar Farouk Ahmed was Military Administrator of Cross River State, Nigeria (August 1996 - August 1998) during the military regime of General Sani Abacha. He was then appointed administrator of Kaduna State in August 1998 during the transitional regime of General Abdulsalami Abubakar, handing over power to the elected civilian governor Ahmed Mohammed Makarfi in May 1999. Shortly after, he was retired by the Federal Government, along with all other former military ministers, governors and administrators.

Ahmed graduated from the Nigeria Defence Academy and the University of Jos, where he obtained an Advanced Diploma in Public Administration. He was commissioned in the army in 1976 as a platoon Battery Commander. Subsequent posts were Military Assistant (1986), General Staff Personnel Training Army Headquarters (1987), Academy Adjutant (1989) and Commanding Officer S.S Wing (1992).

In Cross River, his administration was said to be "most inept". When leaving Kaduna, Ahmed handed over a debt N400 million to his successor, who refused to honor any of his commitments. The Kaduna State House of Assembly resolved to probe his tenure based on allegations of looting. In April 2001, he was one of 16 former military administrators who announced the creation of an association called the United Nigeria Development Forum (UNDF).

He later became a director of First Interstate Bank.

== See also ==
- List of governors of Cross River State
- List of governors of Kaduna State
