= Ango Abdullahi =

Nigerian politician and academic (born 1938)

- Born: 13 December 1938 (age 87); Old Giwa Village, Kaduna
- Citizenship: Nigerian
- Education: University of Ibadan, Ahmadu Bello University
- Spouse: Senator Aisha Alhassan
- Children: Ango Sadiq Abdullahi
- Awards: Commander of the Order of the Niger (CON), Magajin Rafin Zazzau

Ango Abdullahi (born 13 December 1938) is a Nigerian academic and a politician. He is a former vice chancellor of Ahmadu Bello University and former representative of Zaria West constituency of Kaduna State.

== Education ==
He started his primary schooling in Kali Elementary School in 1944 but switched to Giwa Elementary School in his last year, where he completed the requirements to enroll in Zaria Middle School. He attended Barewa College from 1953 to 1958, and the Nigerian College of Arts, Science and Technology from 1959 to 1961. He studied at the University of Ibadan from 1961 to 1964 and the Kansas State University, United States. He proceeded to obtain an MSc. in agronomy at Ahmadu Bello University Zaria in 1968 and a Ph.D. in agronomy in 1976. He became a professor at 40 years and later the vice chancellor of Ahmadu Bello University Zaria.

== Political career ==
He served as a member for Zaria North-West constituency of Kaduna State. Between 1973 and 1975, he served as a commissioner for North-Central State. He was the Ahmadu Bello University's director of agricultural research from 1977 to 1979. He later became the deputy vice chancellor in 1979 and eventually the vice chancellor from 1979 to 1984. He later served from 1999 to 2003 as special adviser to President Olusegun Obasanjo on food and security.

== Personal life ==
Ango was born on 13th December 1938 in Old Giwa village, and he is the father of Ango Sadiq Abdullahi, a member of house of representative. Ango Abdullahi was born on 13 December 1938 in Old Giwa village. He was married to the late senator Aisha Jummai Alhassan, also known as Mama Taraba.

== Awards and honours ==
He was awarded in 2007 as Commander of the Order of the Niger, CON by the Federal Government of Nigeria, and crowned Magajin Rafin Zazzau (Custodian of water and agricultural resources) by his native Zaria Emirate in the same year.
