= Nasir El-Rufai =

Nigerian politician (born 1960)

Mallam Nasir El-Rufai
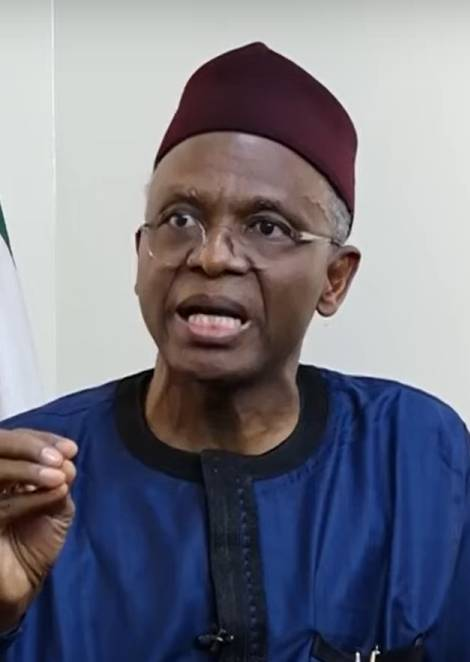
- El-Rufai in 2023

Governor of Kaduna State
- In office 29 May 2015 – 29 May 2023
- Deputy: Barnabas Bala; Hadiza Balarabe
- Preceded by: Mukhtar Yero
- Succeeded by: Uba Sani

Minister of the Federal Capital Territory
- In office 17 July 2003 – 27 July 2007
- President: Olusegun Obasanjo
- Preceded by: Mohammed Abba Gana
- Succeeded by: Aliyu Modibbo Umar

Personal details
- Born: Nasir Ahmad El-Rufai; February 16, 1960 (age 66) Daudawa, Northern Region, British Nigeria (present day Katsina State, Nigeria)
- Party: African Democratic Congress (ADC) (November 2025)
- Other political affiliations: Peoples Democratic Party (until 2009); Congress for Progressive Change (2011–2013); All Progressive Congress (2013–2025); Social Democratic Party (2025)
- Spouses: Hadiza Isma El-Rufai; Asia Ahmad; Aisha Ummi Garba
- Children: 11, including Mohammed Bello
- Education: Barewa College; Ahmadu Bello University; Harvard University; Georgetown University; University of London

Nasir Ahmad el-Rufai CON (born 16 February 1960) is a Nigerian politician who served as the governor of Kaduna State from 2015 to 2023. A member of the African Democratic Congress (ADC) since November 2025 after his defection from the All Progressives Congress (APC) which he was one of the founding member, and served as the minister of the Federal Capital Territory from 2003 to 2007 under the presidency of Olusegun Obasanjo.

== Early life ==
El-Rufai was born on 16 February 1960 to a Fulani family in Daudawa, Katsina State, Nigeria. He was trained in school by his uncle following his father's death when he was eight years.

El-Rufai was educated at Barewa College in Zaria and was a junior to future Nigerian president Umaru Musa Yar'adua, who served as his dormitory captain. He graduated in 1976. He further studied at Ahmadu Bello University where he got a bachelor's degree in quantity surveying. In 1984 and 1985, he received a Master of Business Administration (MBA) and a post graduate diploma in computer science, respectively. He has attended several professional and post-graduate programs, including the Owner-President Management Program (OPM-22) between 1993 and 1995, and the Advanced Management Programme (AMP-162) of the Harvard Business School in 2002. He attended the Georgetown School of Foreign Service of Georgetown University in Washington, D.C. for the Georgetown Leadership Seminar in 2000 and programs on privatization at Arthur D. Little School Management and several leadership development programs of Aspen Institute.

In August 2008, El-Rufai received a law degree from the University of London and a master's degree in public administration from the John F. Kennedy School of Government of Harvard University in June 2009. He also received the Kennedy School Certificate in Public Policy and Management having spent 11 months as an Edward A. Mason Fellow in Public Policy and Management from July 2008 to June 2009. In 2017, he enrolled for a doctorate degree in governance and policy analysis at UNU-MERIT in the Netherlands.

== Business career ==
In 1982, El-Rufai founded El-Rufai & Partners, a quantity surveying consulting firm with three partners, which he managed until 1998. During the military juntas of 1983–1998, the firm received building and civil engineering consultancy contracts including during the construction of Abuja. He also had management positions with telecommunications companies of AT&T and Motorola.

== Political career ==
After the death of military dictator Sani Abacha, his successor Abdulsalami Abubakar began planning the peaceful transition of power, he set up an advisory policy committee which was referred to then as "the presidents think tank" of technocrats to aid in demilitarising the entrenched public administration following years of military dictatorship in Nigeria. Abubakar appointed El-Rufai as an economic advisor on his team in 1998, he resigned from his private sector positions and spent the next year of the transition working primarily on issues with the World Bank, International Monetary Fund, and other financial institutions overseeing the national privatisation program and electoral finance for the 1999 presidential election. On 29 May 1999, Abubakar transferred power to President Olusegun Obasanjo. In November 1999, Obasanjo appointed El-Rufai as the director-general of the Bureau of Public Enterprises, and secretary of the National Council of Privatisation where he spear-headed the privatisation of several government owned corporations under the supervision of Vice President Atiku Abubakar.

=== Minister of the Federal Capital Territory (2003–2007) ===
In July 2003, he was sworn in as the Minister of the Federal Capital Territory. During his tenure, he presided over a radical transformation of the federal capital earlier riddled with corruption and vast deviation from the original Abuja masterplan. With the establishment of the Abuja Geographic Information System, the capital became the first municipality in Nigeria with a computerised land register and information system.

After el-Rufai's appointment was approved by the Nigerian Senate, he accused two senators, Jonathan Zwingina and Ibrahim Mantu (deputy senate president), of asking him for a bribe of $414,000 before his nomination as a minister was approved. Both senators denied the accusation, with Mantu calling him a 'pathological liar'. However, a public hearing convened by the Senate on the matter indicated that El-Rufai may have been telling the truth when both Mantu and Zwingina failed to swear or affirm using the Quran or Bible to say the truth and nothing but the truth, when El-Rufai willingly did so.

A year into el-Rufai's tenure, members of the Senate Public Accounts Committee accused him of paying exorbitant salaries to staff without proper approval and demanded that he reimburse the state. In response, el-Rufai retorted: "Silence is the best answer to a fool". This remark angered the Senate, which went on a two-day strike, demanding that the President sack him for his comments. President Obasanjo issued an apology on his behalf, but it was swiftly rejected by the Senate. As a result, el-Rufai appeared before the Senate to formally apologise, stating "I did not mean what I said. I certainly did not mean to refer to the senators [as fools]. The statement is inappropriate. I made a mistake and I am sorry."

Along with the President and members of the Economic Management Team, El-Rufai led the reform of the Nigerian public service which had become dysfunctional during years of military dictatorship. At various times during his tenure as Minister of the Federal Capital Territory, he was tasked to oversee other agencies like the Federal Ministries of Commerce (twice) and Interior. He also chaired several high-profile cabinet committees that led to the establishment of a mortgage system in Nigeria, National ID card system for Nigeria, Electric Power Supply Improvement and the sale of Federal Government real estate in Abuja.

During the last days of the Obasanjo administration, Nuhu Ribadu, a one-time El-Rufai ally described him as the "de facto No. 2 official", tagging him with the role of Vice President, especially after the fall-out between Obasanjo and his vice president Atiku Abubakar. It is believed that Obasanjo's trust and confidence in El-Rufai angered a vast majority of the political class, which would later persecute him.

==== Demolitions ====
As FCT Minister, el-Rufai came to be known as "Mr Demolition" for his policy of forced evictions and demolitions of illegal buildings and squatter settlements in the capital territory. A report by the Centre on Housing Rights and Evictions, titled 'Forced Evictions: Violations of Human Rights 2003-2006', claimed that 800,000 people living in informal and unauthorised settlements were displaced in an effort to restore Abuja to its original master plan. The report also stated that at least 49 settlements were targeted for demolition by the Federal Capital Development Authority (FCDA) under el-Rufai's leadership. It is noteworthy that the Centre published its report without ever interfacing with the Federal Capital Territory Administration which El-Rufai headed.

By the end of El-Rufai's term, the government had demolished 945 buildings in the FCT, around 300 in Kubwa, and 12,000 shanties in squatter settlements across Idu Karmo, Jiwa, Gwarimpa, Jabi, and Anguwan Mada. Notably, one of the demolished buildings was the residence of the PDP National Chairman, Ahmadu Ali, in Asokoro, which was removed for being built over a water trunk line. El-Rufai also revoked 1.2 hectares of land in the Central Area owned by late businessman and ruling party financier, Joseph Igwe, as the land was designated as a green park, railway corridor and church in the Abuja master plan.

=== Exile and return ===
In 2008, El-Rufai went into self-imposed exile and became a vocal critic of the Umaru Yar'Adua administration.

On 1 May 2010, he returned to Nigeria and was subsequently invited for questioning by the Economic and Financial Crimes Commission (EFCC). He appeared at the Commission on 6 May and released on administrative bail on the same day. He explained his return was in order to clear his name of allegations of abuse of office and corruption. In 2011, el-Rufai joined party politics with the Congress for Progressive Change supporting Muhammadu Buhari's campaign in the 2011 presidential election. In 2013, Justice Sadiq of the Federal Capital Territory High Court discharged and acquitted El-Rufai of all the allegations levelled by the EFCC against him.

=== All Progressives Congress ===
In 2013, el-Rufai was appointed deputy national secretary of the newly formed All Progressives Congress (APC).

In September 2014, El-Rufai declared his intention to campaign for Governor of Kaduna State, contesting the APC governorship primaries to emerge as the party's candidate for Governor of Kaduna State. He went on to win the governorship election, with over one million votes to defeat the incumbent Governor Mukhtar Ramalan Yero the candidate of the People's Democratic Party with a margin of more than 400,000 votes. In 2018, he again emerged as the APC's governorship candidate. He was re-elected on 9 March 2019, defeating his closest rival by over 200,000 votes.

== Governorship ==
On 29 May 2015, El-Rufai was sworn in as the 22nd Governor of Kaduna State. In his inaugural address, he declared that he and his deputy were cutting their allowances by half pending an improvement in the state's fiscal situation. On 6 August 2015, El-Rufai in one of his first acts as governor announced that Kaduna State will adopt the Treasury Single Account policy by 1 September of the same year. At the end of the exercise, 470 accounts belonging to different ministries, departments and agencies were closed and a sum of N24.7 billion was recovered and remitted to the Kaduna State Government TSA with the Central Bank of Nigeria.

By blocking leakages and cutting the cost of running government, it is estimated that the El-Rufai administration was able to save N1.2 billion in just two months. El-Rufai also reformed the civil service in Kaduna State and reduced the number of ministries from 19 to 13 and the number of permanent secretaries from 35 to 18. In a bid to reduce the cost of governance, El-Rufai appointed only 13 commissioners, 10 special advisers and 12 special assistants as against the 24 commissioners, 41 special advisers and about 400 special assistants appointed by the previous PDP administration.

As governor, El-Rufai has embarked on a comprehensive education reform with the goal of revamping the moribund state of public education in Kaduna State. El-Rufai sacked over 22,000 unqualified primary teachers, that failed to score above 75% in a Primary 4 test, and went on to hire 25,000 qualified teachers as replacements. El-Rufai's administration launched the School Feeding Programme, aimed at providing one free meal per day to 1.5 million pupils in public primary schools within the state. This policy amongst others contributed to raising primary school enrolment to over 2.1 million by the time El-Rufai completed his first term of office. He also abolished the collection of any fees and levies in public primary and junior secondary schools in Kaduna, thereby removing an annual financial burden of N3 billion from the parents. As a sign of his faith in public education, El-Rufai enrolled his son Abubakar Sadiq El-Rufai as a Primary One pupil in Kaduna Capital School, a government primary school in Kaduna.

On 28 March 2020, El-Rufai tested positive for COVID-19, following contact with an index case in Abuja. A few days earlier, he had placed a curfew in Kaduna State and restricted movement, to prevent the spread of the virus. He remained in isolation for 26 days, during which the Deputy Governor, Dr. Hadiza Balarabe was in charge of government business in the state.

On 20 August 2020, a controversy arose on social media when the Nigerian Bar Association invited Governor El-rufai to speak at its annual conference. Thousands of Nigerians signed a petition on change.org to have Governor El-rufai's invitation revoked. The NBA succumbed to the pressure and disinvited the governor. A report by Open Bar initiative cited eight reasons why El-rufai's invitation to the general conference was turned down. Some of the reasons include his refusal to obey court orders in his case with Audu Maikori, threatening Gloria Ballason who was Maikori's lawyer and a report by Quartz (publication) Africa which named Governor El-Rufai as the head of a "powerful" group of Nigerian governors who "now regularly use security agents to arrest and intimidate journalists who dare to question their actions or attempt to hold them accountable". Upon leaving office in 2023, El-Rufai sued the Open Bar Initiative and its prime mover, Dr. Chidi Odinkalu for defamation in a celebrated case before the Federal Capital Territory High Court in Abuja. A judgment is being awaited as at the end of 2025.

In one of his final acts as Governor, El Rufai granted pardon to 12 prisoners in Kaduna State, 10 of whom were nearing the end of their sentences, some of the pardons were also granted due to age. Additionally he reduced one prisoners death sentence to life in prison. On 1 August 2023, he was screened by the Senate, following his nomination as minister by President Bola Tinubu.

== Post–governorship ==
On 27 July 2023, president Bola Tinubu nominated El-Rufai and 27 others for ministerial appointment. The list was forwarded to the Nigerian Senate for screening. However, after the overall screening exercise, it was revealed that El-Rufai's confirmation had been withheld due to a negative security report signed by an unnamed officer of the country's secret police, the SSS. El-Rufai immediately withdrew from the ministerial consideration, nominating Jafaru Sani from Kaduna State in his place. Both El-Rufai and Sani were eventually not appointed minister.

In December 2023, El-Rufai co-founded a venture capital firm based in Abuja, FCT with a US$100 million investment commitment to promote technological innovation, employment opportunities and the overall economy of Nigeria. Since then, El-Rufai's Afri-Venture Capital has invested in many startups and been the driving force behind Arewa Tech-Fest - an investment promotion, technology and innovation event to search out start-ups in Northern Nigeria. The first edition was co-hosted with the State Government in Kano in September 2024 and the second edition took place in partnership with the Katsina State Government in Katsina in May 2025. The third edition is expected to be hosted in collaboration with the Zamfara State Government sometime in 2026.

In March 2024, El-Rufai met with chairman of the Social Democratic Party (SDP), as well as other opposition party leaders causing media speculation that El-Rufai may defect from the APC to the SDP ahead of the 2027 general elections.

On October 1, 2024, El-Rufai announced his intention to return to politics in the next general election in 2027, stating "there is no retirement in politics" in a Hausa-language broadcast on popular northern broadcaster Freedom Radio Nigeria. This revelation came on the backdrop of a private conversation held in Washington, D.C. at the Council of Foreign Relations on the subject of Nigeria's Political Future with Ebenezer Obadare.

On 10 March 2025, Nasir El-Rufai announced his defection from the ruling All Progressive Change (APC) to the Social Democratic Party (SDP), citing a growing misalignment between his personal values and the current direction of the APC as the primary reason for his decision. Upon the adoption of the African Democratic Congress (ADC) as the coalition platform for the 2027 general election, El-Rufai expressed deep regret that the SDP refused to meet the conditions for adoption as the coalition platform, and promised to join the ADC once some upcoming bye-elections and other off-season elections are concluded by November 2025.

On 17 February 2026, Nasir El-Rufai was arrest by Economic and Financial Crimes Commission (EFCC) over allegedly N423 billion siphoned, Shortly after being granted bail by the over alleged corruption, former Kaduna State Governor Nasir El-Rufai was re-arrested by armed operatives outside the commission’s headquarters. The identity of the arresting agency remained unclear, with reports linking the operation to the Independent Corrupt Practices and Other Related Offences Commission (ICPC). The re-arrest followed cybercrime charges filed by the SSS at the Federal High Court in Abuja, alleging that El-Rufai unlawfully intercepted the communications of National Security Adviser Nuhu Ribadu, in violation of the Cybercrimes (Amendment) Act, 2024, and the Nigerian Communications Act, 2003. The developments came days after a reported attempt to arrest him at the Nnamdi Azikiwe International Airport, Abuja, upon his return from abroad, and amid broader investigations into alleged financial misconduct during his tenure.

== Controversies and public image ==
In 2012, when rumors spread of a Nigerian Army formation under instructions of Governor Jonah Jang of Plateau State planning to invade a Fulani settlement, El-Rufai issued a warning to the military of the consequences via his Twitter handle thus: "We will write this for all to read. Anyone, soldier or not that kills the Fulani takes a loan payable one day no matter how long it takes.".

In 2019, El-Rufai said, in reference to a conspiracy theory that election observers intended to engage in meddling in the Nigerian election, that "the person who will come and intervene...will go back in body bags because nobody will come to Nigeria and tell us how to run our country"

In December 2021, International Christian Concern a Christian non-governmental organization (NGO) published a report alleging that El-Rufai punished Christian protestors in Kaduna State. The report details two incidents in which El-Rufai responded to protests by putting the protesting community under communal house arrest, preventing them from tending to their farms and making early warnings of attacks—which soon came—impossible. Citing local witnesses, the report indicates that non-Christian Fulani communities were not similarly locked down.

The report of the NGO indicates that first of these lockdown orders was in December 2016 in Jema'a Local Government area and the second stretched 72 days starting in June 2020, but that the pattern included at least six targeted lockdowns. The second lockdown referred to by the International Christian Concern coincided with broader responses due to the COVID-19 pandemic, but was selectively and lethally enforced against Christian communities, according to sources cited though non-Christians were certainly impacted by COVID-19 restrictions as well.

Reports indicate that eleven villagers were killed during the 2016 lockdown. The report lists a number of attacks that happened during the 2020 lockdown due to COVID-19 pandemic, and alleges that a total of about 120 villagers were killed at that time. The report also alleges that El-Rufai has punished protestors with these lockdown orders at least six times since the first incident in 2016.

The report goes on to document El-Rufai's vast wealth as evidenced by his and his family's wide international travels, 'extravagant' lifestyle, and the fact that he sends one of his sons to a private boarding school in Canada where tuition runs about $44,000 USD per year. El-Rufai has long been a wealthy man, notably gaining significant wealth through government contracts early in his career. He faced charges for financial mishandling at the time and fled the country, before charges were dropped and he returned.

In October 2021, he resurrected and updated the Religious Preaching Edict of 1984 to create the State Preaching Regulatory Council. This state body has the authority to approve or deny any religious leader the license to preach, but was wrongly interpreted to mean that the Council can disapprove the content of their sermons and messages. "Anyone who begins to preach without authorization, will be liable to pay a fine and may even be imprisoned," El-Rufai said in a radio interview after the enactment of the law by the State House of Assembly.

El-Rufai amplified claims, in a tweet posted on September 8, 2014, that Christians were behind Boko Haram, funding and controlling it to tarnish the name of Islam. Boko Haram is not funded by Christians but is an Islamist terror group with strong ties to Islamic State.

In 2023 some Christian Elders in Kaduna expressed outrage when a video emerged of El-Rufai claiming that "those that are not Muslims (in Southern Kaduna) don't vote for our party. Most of them. So, why should I give them the deputy position? I did my calculation, and I knew we could win the election without giving them the deputy governor", adding later that "of course, Kubau [a Muslim area] voted for us the most, so I'll add something to Kubau because they voted for us. What I'll give Jaba [a Christian area], I'll increase it for Kubau because Jaba didn't vote for us."

In reaction, representatives from the Catholic Diocesan Priests Association in Kaduna, Nigeria, Zaria and Kafanchan, which are all within the borders of Kaduna state, labelled the comments a "divisive, bigoted, hateful and completely unstatesmanlike declaration of Islamic political supremacism in Kaduna State and Nigeria". Those outraged neither contradicted what El-Rufai posited nor showed in what way or form what was said amounted to religious discrimination. El-Rufai has challenged anyone to show in actual governance of Kaduna State, any person or group have been discriminated against.

== Personal life ==
El-Rufai has four wives. His first wife Hadiza Isma El-Rufai, is a writer and novelist; they were married in 1985 and have five children - Yasmin (died in 2011), Mohammed Bello, Hamza (died in 2014), Bashir, and Ibrahim. A polyglot with masters' degrees in architecture, business administration and creative writing, she runs the Yasmin El-Rufai Foundation (YELF), set up in honour of their daughter who died in 2011. His son Muhammed Bello El-Rufai is a member of the House of Representatives. He is a Muslim.

He also married Asia Ahmad El-Rufai in August 1999. They have three children - Ahmad, Bilqiss and Mustapha. Asia is a lawyer engaged in corporate legal practice and training. El-Rufai's third wife is Aisha Garba El-Rufai who became his wife in November 2010. They have four children - Abubakar Sadiq, Nafeesa Nasreen, Rabiah Ummah and Fatima Layyan. El-Rufai's fourth wife is Aichatou Assabe Djibril El-Rufai who married him in December 2020. They have a son, Jibril Arif El-Rufai from the union. El-Rufai is a devout Muslim.

== Honours and awards ==
In October 2002, President Olusegun Obasanjo conferred the national honor of the Officer of the Order of the Federal Republic (OFR) for his construction to the development of the Nigerian construction industry.

In 2005, the University of Abuja conferred the degree of Doctor of Science (Honoris Causa) in Engineering for his contribution to the restoration of the Abuja Master Plan and the development of the Federal Capital Territory.

During his tenure as Governor of Kaduna State in October 2022, the Nigerian national honour of Commander of the Order of the Niger (CON) was conferred on him by President Muhammadu Buhari for the exceptional governance of Kaduna State.

== See also ==
- List of governors of Kaduna State
- Mass killings in Southern Kaduna
