= Barnabas Bala =

Nigerian politician and architect (1956–2021)

Deputy Governor of Kaduna State
- In office 29 May 2015 – 29 May 2019
- Governor: Nasir El-Rufai
- Preceded by: Nuhu Bajoga
- Succeeded by: Hadiza Balarabe

Chairman of the APC, Kaduna State
- In office 2 October 2014 – 29 May 2015

Personal details
- Born: Barnabas Yusuf Bala; 20 December 1956 Kaura, Northern Region, British Nigeria (now in Kaduna State, Nigeria)
- Died: 11 July 2021 (aged 64)
- Party: All Progressives Congress
- Education: University of Lagos
- Occupation: architect; politician

Barnabas Yusuf Bala (20 December 1956 – 11 July 2021), popularly known as Bala Bantex, was a Nigerian architect and politician. He served as Deputy Governor of Kaduna State from May 2015 to May 2019 under Governor Nasir El-Rufai. Prior to that, he was Kaduna State Chairman of the All Progressives Congress (APC) from October 2014 to May 2015.

== Early life and education ==
Barnabas Bala was born on 20 December 1956 in Kaura, Northern Region of British Nigeria (now in Kaduna State). He earned a degree in Architecture from the University of Lagos.

== Career ==
=== Architectural career ===
He founded the architectural firm Bantex Consortium, through which he designed and supervised construction projects across northern Nigeria. His firm’s work included notable commissions such as church buildings, institutional complexes—and drew commendations from figures including President Obasanjo and General Ibrahim Babangida.

=== Political career ===
Bala served as Chairman of the APC in Kaduna State from 2014 to 2015. In 2015, he was elected as Deputy Governor of Kaduna State, serving until 2019. He later contested the Senate seat for Kaduna South in 2019 but was unsuccessful.

== Death and burial ==
Barnabas Bala died on 11 July 2021 in Abuja after a protracted illness, at the age of 64. His funeral in Manchok, Kaura LGA, Kaduna State, drew widespread tributes—including from Governor El-Rufai, who described him as "one of the most honest and decent humans I have ever come across." Bantex was also remembered for his architectural contributions such as designing the ECWA headquarters in Jos.

== See also ==
- List of Nigerian politicians
- University of Lagos alumni
