= Jonathan Gyet Maude =

Kpop (Dr.) Jonathan Danladi Gyet Maude (JP, OON)

Paramount ruler of Ham (Jaba) Chiefdom
- In office: 1974 – date
- Coronation: 1974
- Predecessor: Kpop Dogo Saghon
- Born: 1938 (age 87–88)
Names
- English: Jonathan Danladi Gyet Maude
- House: Maude
- Religion: Evangelical Christianity

Jonathan Danladi Gyet Maude (born 1938) is the paramount ruler of Ham (Jaba) Chiefdom, a Nigerian traditional state in southern Kaduna State, Nigeria. He is also known by the title "Chief of Jaba (Ham)".

He is a member of the Maude ruling house of Ham Chiefdom; the other two are the Tiroa and Saghon ruling houses.

In solidarity towards the people of Asholyio (Moroa) and Takad chiefdoms attacked by the Fulani terrorists in Kaura Local Government Area of the state, Maude led a delegation to the local government secretariat, where he was quoted to have said:

“We came here to empathize with you because we are one and sharing your pains. We are deeply worried and decided to cancel the annual Tuk Ham and come here straight in commemoration of what happened to your communities. We brought also message of hope and peace, that God is with us and will not forsake us.”

He thereafter presented some relief materials to the Agwam Takad, HH Tobias Nkom Wada who received them with gratitude and prayed that God bring stability to the area and country at large.

== Awards ==
Maude is a recipient of the DINMA 2006 award, one of the PSR National Awards, for "Traditional Leadership".
