= Kwoi =

Kwoi Kwain
- Town
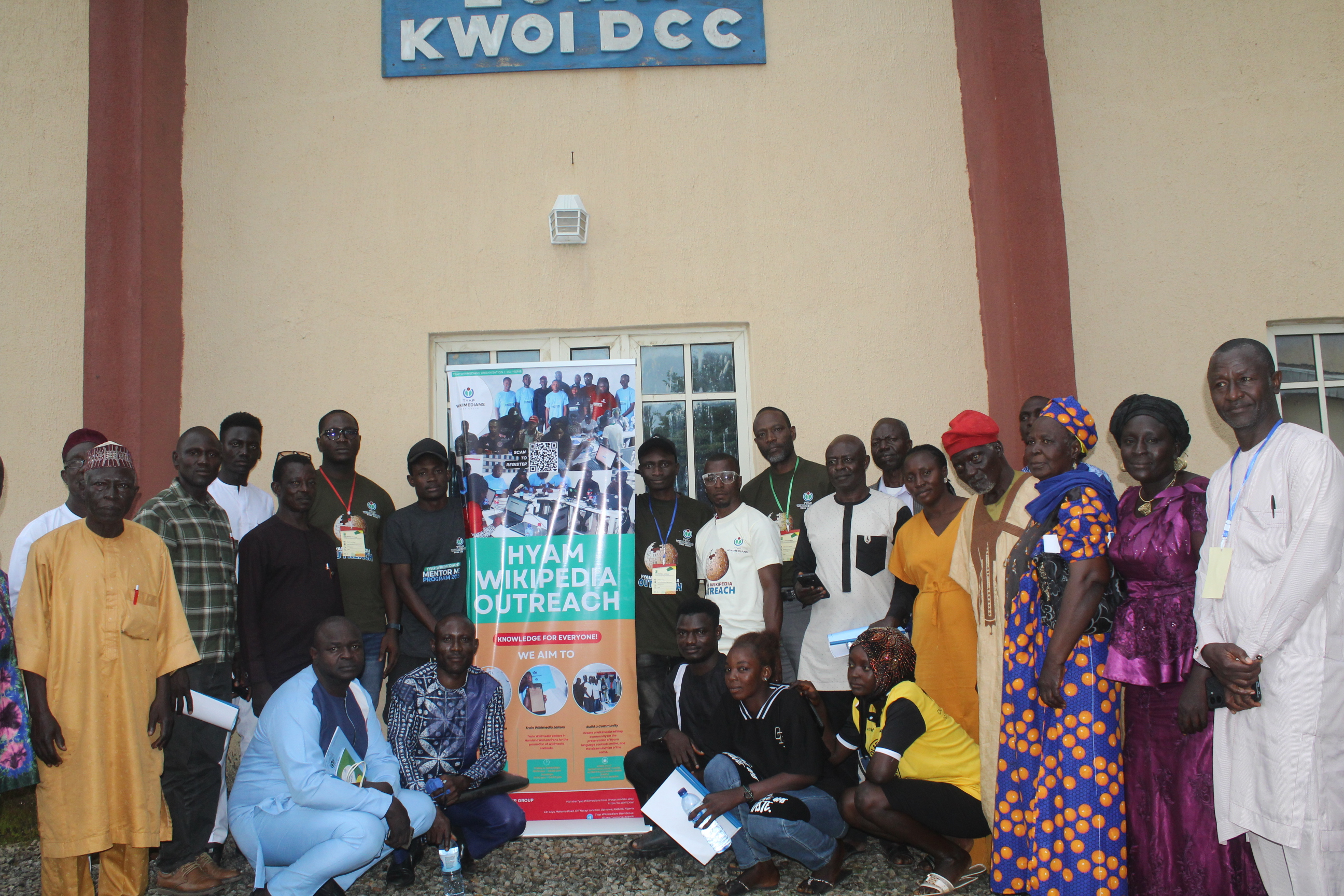
- Hyam Wikipedia outreach program day-6

- Location within Nigeria
- Coordinates: 09°27′N 08°00′E
- Country: Nigeria
- State: Kaduna State
- LGA: Jaba
- Chiefdom: Ham (Jaba)

Government
  - Type: Elective Monarchy
  - Kpop Ham: Kpop (Dr.) Jonathan Danladi Gyet Maude (JP, OON)
- Time zone: UTC+01:00 (WAT)
- Climate: Aw

Kwoi (Hyam: Kwain) is a town in Jaba Local Government Area as well as the Ham (Jaba) Chiefdom headquarters, in southern Kaduna state in the Middle Belt region of Nigeria. The town has a post office.

== People and Culture ==
The Ham people can be found in Kwoi. They speak the Hyam language The Hyam language has many dialects.

== See also ==
- List of villages in Kaduna State
