= 2023 Kaduna State gubernatorial election =

2023 gubernatorial election in Kaduna State, Nigeria

- 18 March 2023
- Registered: 4,335,208
Nominee	Uba Sani	Isa Ashiru	Jonathan Asake
Party	APC	PDP	LP
Running mate	Hadiza Sabuwa Balarabe	John Ayuba	Bashir Idris Aliyu
Popular vote	730,002	719,196	58,283
Percentage	47.20%	46.49%	3.77%
Governor before election
Nasir Ahmad el-Rufai
APC
Elected Governor
Uba Sani
APC

The 2023 Kaduna State gubernatorial election was held on 18 March 2023, to elect the Governor of Kaduna State, concurrent with elections to the Kaduna State House of Assembly as well as twenty-seven other gubernatorial elections and elections to all other state houses of assembly. The election — which was postponed from its original 11 March date — was held three weeks after the presidential election and National Assembly elections. Incumbent APC Governor Nasir Ahmad el-Rufai was term-limited and could not seek re-election to a third term. Senator Uba Sani retained the office for the APC by a margin of less than 1% — under 11,000 votes — over first runner-up and PDP nominee Isa Ashiru, a former member of the House of Representatives.

Party primaries were scheduled for between 4 April and 9 June 2022 with the Peoples Democratic Party nominating Ashiru on 25 May while the All Progressives Congress nominated Sani — Senator for Kaduna Central — on 26 May. In August, Jonathan Asake — a former House of Representatives member and former Southern Kaduna Peoples Union President — won the nomination of the Labour Party in a rerun primary.

On 21 March, INEC declared Sani as the victor amid considerable protests at the collation centre from other candidates' agents. The official totals showed Sani winning just over 730,000 votes (~47% of the vote) to defeat Ashiru with about 719,000 votes (~46% of the vote) and Asake, who won around 58,000 votes (~4% of the vote). Due to alleged irregularities, Ashiru rejected the results and filed a challenge at the electoral tribunal. The legal case eventually reached the Supreme Court, which upheld the election of Sani in a January 2024 judgment.

== Electoral system ==
The Governor of Kaduna State is elected using a modified two-round system. To be elected in the first round, a candidate must receive the plurality of the vote and over 25% of the vote in at least two-thirds of state local government areas. If no candidate passes this threshold, a second round will be held between the top candidate and the next candidate to have received a plurality of votes in the highest number of local government areas.

== Background ==
Kaduna State is a large, diverse northwestern state with a growing economy and vast natural areas but facing an underdeveloped agricultural sector and intense challenges in security as the nationwide kidnapping epidemic, bandit conflict, inter-ethnic violence, and herder–farmer clashes have all heavily affected the state.

Politically, the 2019 elections were categorized as a slight solidification of the Kaduna APC's control as el-Rufai won re-election with over 55% of the vote and the party retained its House of Assembly majority. Federally, the APC regained two of the three Senate seats it lost due to defections and won eleven of the sixteen House of Representatives seats. For the presidency, Kaduna was won by APC nominee Muhammadu Buhari with about 60% but swung slightly towards the PDP. The 2019 elections also showed the political divide between the diverse, Christian-majority Southern region and the mainly Hausa and Fulani, Muslim-majority Northern and Central regions as the former region moved towards the PDP while the latter two regions stuck with the APC.

Ahead of el-Rufai's second term, his administration stated focuses included government reform, forging a positive business environment, unity, education, and urban development. In terms of his performance, el-Rufai was praised for proper budgeting, expanding free education, a proactive response to the beginning of the COVID-19 pandemic, urban infrastructure development, and raising pensions. However, he faced criticism for alleged anti-Christian sentiment in the state government, rising insecurity and el-Rufai's irresponsible statements on it, and labour disputes along with authoritarian-esque actions including the arrest of journalists and the infiltration of Amnesty International Nigeria.

== Primary elections ==
The primaries, along with any potential challenges to primary results, were to take place between 4 April and 3 June 2022 but the deadline was extended to 9 June. According to some candidates and community groups, an informal zoning gentlemen's agreement sets the Kaduna South Senatorial District to have the next governor as the only governor from the south did not finish his term. However, no major party zoned their nomination. Another informal convention mandated different religion tickets with one running mate being Christian while the other was Muslim; however, el-Rufai discarded this tradition in 2019 and neither party committed to a return to the tradition.

=== All Progressives Congress ===
By early 2022, reports emerged that el-Rufai was looking to endorse a member of his core inner circle to succeed him with names like former commissioner Muhammad Sani Abdullahi, Senator Uba Sani, and Deputy Governor Hadiza Sabuwa Balarabe being floated as the major potential candidates. In early 2022, reports came out that the el-Rufai's endorsement process had culminated in Sani emerging as his pick while Abdullahi was to run to replace Sani in the Senate and Balarabe would become Sani's running mate. While both Abdullahi and Balarabe accepted the process and dropped their gubernatorial ambitions, other candidates like former House of Representatives member Sani Sha'aban objected to the endorsement process and labeled it as undemocratic and illegitimate.

On 20 April 2022, the APC National Executive Committee announced the party's schedule for gubernatorial primaries, setting its expression of interest form price at ₦10 million and nomination form price at ₦40 million with a 50% nomination form discount for candidates younger than 40 while women and candidates with disabilities get free nomination forms. Forms were to be sold from 26 April to 6 May until the deadline was later extended to 10 May then 12 May. After the submission of nomination forms by 13 May, candidates were screened by a party committee on 14 and 15 May while 16 May was the date for the screening appeal process. Ward congresses and LGA congresses were set for between 7 and 9 May to elect delegates for the primary. Candidates approved by the screening process advanced to a primary set for 26 May, in concurrence with other APC gubernatorial primaries; challenges to the result could be made the next day.

In the days before the primary, disputes emerged over the delegate list as Sani's opponents—Bashir Abubakar and Sha'aban—accused el-Rufai of imposing delegates without proper congresses and called for national party intervention. However, the congress appeals committee upheld the delegate elections and labeled the exercise as "successful." Pre-primary analysis stated that although Sha'aban expected support from politicians close to his in-law President Muhammadu Buhari, it was "safe to project" Sani would win. On primary day, the three candidates contested an indirect primary that ended with Sani's wide victory after results showed him over 96% of the delegates' votes. After the votes were collated, Sani thanked delegates, el-Rufai, and his opponents in his acceptance speech but both Abubakar and Sha'aban wholeheartedly rejected the results. The weeks after the primary were dominated by the search for Sani's running mate; the first part of el Rufai's plan went well with Abdullahi winning the senatorial primary but opposition emerged to Balarabe continuing as the deputy gubernatorial nominee. Previous informal convention was against same religion tickets and the pick of Balarabe would be the second consecutive APC ticket in violation of the convention as both Sani and Balarabe are Muslim; Christian groups lobbied against another Muslim-Muslim ticket and noted that such a ticket would be untimely amid a rise in religious tension and violence. Despite the outcry, Sani picked Balarabe as his running mate on 4 July. In response, observers expressed worry over religious equality and tensions if the APC ticket won while some groups called for asked voters to reject Sani. Meanwhile, Sha'aban filed a lawsuit against Sani's nomination based on allegedly improper primary conduct; however, the case was dismissed by a Federal High Court in November 2022 and the Supreme Court in February 2023.

==== Nominated ====
- Uba Sani: Senator for Kaduna Central (2019–present) and former aide to former President Olusegun Obasanjo
  - Running mate—Hadiza Sabuwa Balarabe: Deputy Governor (2019–present)

==== Eliminated in primary ====
- Bashir Abubakar: former Customs Service official
- Sani Sha'aban: former House of Representatives member for Zaria, 2007 ANPP gubernatorial nominee, and in-law of President Muhammadu Buhari

==== Withdrew ====
- Muhammad Sani Abdullahi: former Commissioner for Budget and Planning (2015–2019; 2021–2022) and former Chief of Staff to el-Rufai (2019–2021)
- Abdulmalik Durunguwa: National Population Commission Commissioner (2018–present)
- Bashir Y Jamoh: Director-General of the Nigerian Maritime Administration and Safety Agency (2020–present)

==== Declined ====
- Mohammad Mahmood Abubakar: Minister of Agriculture and Rural Development (2021–present), Minister of Environment (2019–2021), and former House of Assembly member
- Olumuyiwa Adekeye: el-Rufai aide
- Mukhtar Ahmed: House of Representatives member for Kaduna South (2019–present) and former el-Rufai aide
- Samuel Aruwan: Commissioner for Internal Security and Home Affairs (2019–present)
- Saude Atoyebi: el-Rufai aide
- Hadiza Sabuwa Balarabe: Deputy Governor (2019–present)
- Muhammad Hafiz Bayero: Administrator of the Kaduna Capital Territory (2021–present)
- Peter Akagu Jones: former el-Rufai aide
- Suleiman Abdu Kwari: Senator for Kaduna North (2019–present) and Commissioner for Finance (2015–2019)
- Balarabe Abbas Lawal: Secretary to the State Government (2015–present)
- Abdullahi Mukhtar Mohammed: former CEO of the National Hajj Commission and former Chairman of the Kaduna State Pilgrims Board
- Idris Othman: businessman and brother of former Senator Suleiman Othman Hunkuyi
- Muhammad Dayyabu Paki: Director-General of the Kaduna Facilities Management Agency and former Ikara Local Government Interim Management Committee Chairman
- Muhammad Bashir Saidu: Commissioner for Finance (2019–present), former Chief of Staff to el-Rufai (2016–2019), and former Commissioner for Local Government (2015–2016)
- Ja'afaru Ibrahim Sani: Commissioner for Local Government Affairs (2017–present)
- Hadiza Bala Usman: former managing director of the Nigerian Ports Authority (2016–2021) and co-founder of the Bring Back Our Girls campaign

==== Results ====
Candidates' vote share
1. Uba Sani (96.1%)
2. Bashir Abubakar (3.09%)
3. Sani Sha'aban (0.84%)

APC primary results
Party	Candidate	Votes	%
APC	Uba Sani	1,149	96.07%
APC	Bashir Abubakar	37	3.09%
APC	Sani Sha'aban	10	0.84%
Total votes		1,196	100.00%
Invalid or blank votes		39	N/A
Turnout		1,235	99.20%

=== People's Democratic Party ===
On 16 March 2022, the national PDP announced its gubernatorial primaries' schedule, setting its expression of interest form price at ₦1 million and the nomination form price at ₦20 million with a 50% discount for candidates between 25 and 30. Forms were to be sold until 1 April but the party later extended the deadline four times before reaching a final deadline of 22 April. After the submission of nomination forms by 25 April, candidates were screened by a party committee on 28 April while 2 May was the rescheduled date for the screening appeal process. Ward congresses were set for 29 April and LGA congresses were rescheduled for 10 May to elect delegates for the primary. Candidates approved by the screening process advanced to a primary set for 25 May, in concurrence with all other PDP gubernatorial primaries; challenges to the result could be made in the following days.

Pre-primary analysis labeled Isa Ashiru—a former MHR and the party's 2019 nominee—as the frontrunner but noted his opponents had a chance for an upset. On the primary date, one major candidate (former Senator Yusuf Datti Baba-Ahmed) withdrew while the other six candidates continued to an indirect primary that ended in Isa Ashiru emerging as the PDP nominee after results showed Ashiru winning over 56% of the delegates' votes. However, controversy rose after the primary when it was alleged that Ashiru had colluded with Kaduna PDP Chairman Felix Hyat to manipulate the delegate list in Ashiru's favour in exchange for Hyat becoming Ashiru's running mate. Despite this alleged plan, Ashiru announced former commissioner John Ayuba as his running mate in June; noting the regional balance as Ayuba is from Kaduna South while Ashiru is from Kaduna North. In July, Baba-Ahmed defected to the LP to become its vice-presidential nominee.

==== Nominated ====
- Isa Ashiru: 2019 PDP gubernatorial nominee, former House of Representatives member for Makarfi/Kudan, and former House of Assembly member for Kudan
  - Running mate—John Ayuba: former Commissioner for Finance

==== Eliminated in primary ====
- Mohammed Sani Abbas: barrister and financial consultant
- Haruna Yunusa Saeed: 2019 SDP gubernatorial nominee, 2015 APC gubernatorial candidate, and 2011 CPC gubernatorial nominee
- Shehu Sani: former Senator for Kaduna Central (2015–2019)
- Muhammad Sani Sidi: 2019 PDP gubernatorial candidate and former Director-General of the National Emergency Management Agency (2010–2017)
- Mukhtar Ramalan Yero: 2019 PDP gubernatorial candidate, former Governor (2012–2015), former Deputy Governor (2010–2012), and Commissioner of Finance (2007–2010)

==== Withdrew ====
- Yusuf Datti Baba-Ahmed: former Senator for Kaduna North (2011–2012) and former House of Representatives member for Zaria (2003–2007) (defected after to the primary to become the LP vice presidential nominee)

==== Declined ====
- Muhammad Sani Bello: 2019 PDP gubernatorial candidate

==== Results ====
Candidates' vote share
1. Isa Ashiru (56.7%)
2. Muhammad Sani Sidi (35.6%)
3. Other candidates (7.67%)

PDP primary results
Party	Candidate	Votes	%
PDP	Isa Ashiru	414	56.71%
PDP	Muhammad Sani Sidi	260	35.62%
PDP	Mukhtar Ramalan Yero	28	3.84%
PDP	Mohammed Sani Abbas	15	2.05%
PDP	Haruna Yunusa Saeed	11	1.51%
PDP	Shehu Sani	2	0.27%
Total votes		730	100.00%
Invalid or blank votes		30	N/A
Turnout		760	Unknown

=== Minor parties ===
- Timothy Sherman Adamu (Action Alliance)
  - Running mate: Ismail Umar Abubakar
- Yusuf Jibril (Action Democratic Party)
  - Running mate: John Yayock Solomon
- Yahaya Musa Kallah (Action Peoples Party)
  - Running mate: Zipporah Samuel Bijeh
- Caleb Zagi (African Democratic Congress)
  - Running mate: Kabir Lawal Jibril
- Yahaya Alhassan (Allied Peoples Movement)
  - Running mate: Maina Maimuna Kyari
- Andrew Abui Duya (All Progressives Grand Alliance)
  - Running mate: Mohammed Auwal Yunusa
- Jonathan Asake (Labour Party)
  - Running mate: Bashir Idris Aliyu
- Suleiman Othman Hunkuyi (New Nigeria Peoples Party)
  - Running mate: Sani Mazawaje
- Salihu Abubakar Gambo (National Rescue Movement)
  - Running mate: Magaji Linda Danladi
- Hayatuddeen Lawal (People's Redemption Party)
  - Running mate: Ashidi Manasseh Mamman
- Adamu Abubakar Idris (Social Democratic Party)
  - Running mate: Grace Zagwai Sankut
- Yaya Sanin Yaya (Young Progressives Party)
  - Running mate: Ramson Nwoha

== Campaign ==
As the general election campaign began in June 2022, pundits focused on the major candidates' search for running mates. Due to geopolitical dynamics and the state's religious diversity, informal convention states that a nominee from Kaduna Central or North districts should pick a running mate from Southern Kaduna and vice versa along with balancing the ticket religiously by picking a ticket with one Muslim and one Christian. As both the PDP and the APC nominated Muslims from the Central and North districts, they were expected to select a southern Christian running mate. While Ashiru followed the convention by picking John Ayuba—a Christian from Zangon Kataf LGA, the APC again violated the religious part of the convention by renominating incumbent Deputy Governor Hadiza Sabuwa Balarabe—a Muslim from Sanga LGA. As the national APC also violated the anti-same religion ticket convention by nominating the Bola Tinubu-Kashim Shettima slate and el-Rufai faced constant criticism of his handling of inter-religious tensions, analysts noted the likely significance of religious identity in the Kaduna election. However, Ayuba's selection was not without controversy either as youth groups lamented his age of 68.

As the general election campaign began in July and August, reporting also pointed out other potential factors like the el-Rufai administration's urban renewal projects, APC members aggrieved by the contentious party primary, Sani's senate performance, expected PDP dominance in Southern Kaduna, and PDP internal disputes along with the more prominent minor party nominees—Jonathan Asake (LP), Suleiman Othman Hunkuyi (NNPP), and Hayatuddeen Lawal Makarfi (PRP). Further analysis by November surmised that the two strongest minor party nominees—Asake and Othman Hunkuyi—could split the formerly PDP base, potentially allowing Sani to win with a plurality.

With the election nearing, BBC Hausa organized a debate on 18 January 2023 and invited Sani, Asake, Othman Hunkuyi, and Ashiru to participate. (Note: Although Sani Sha'aban was initially invited to the debate, his invitation was withdrawn the day before the debate as he was not yet officially the ADP nominee.) While Asake did not attend, the other three had a heated debate on topics ranging from agriculture to security. In February, focus mainly switched to the presidential election on 25 February. In the election, Kaduna State voted for Atiku Abubakar (PDP); Abubakar won the state with 40.8% of the vote to defeat Bola Tinubu (APC) at 29.4%, Peter Obi (LP) at 21.7%, and Rabiu Kwankwaso (NNPP) at 6.8%. Considered a slight surprise, the result led to increased focus on the gubernatorial race due to the significant margin of victory for Abubakar and PDP success in the state's National Assembly elections. Gubernatorial campaign analysis from after the presidential election noted shock from APC figures that pushed the party to call on Islamic clerics to market voting for its Muslim-Muslim ticket as a "religious obligation" while other pundits emphasized that Asake's path to victory came from sweeping Christian voters if the Muslim voters split between Sani and Ashiru. At the same time, other observers like Jaafar Jaafar doubted Asake's chances of victory and reiterated that Asake's strength among formerly PDP supporting southern communities could allow Sani to win by splitting the old PDP base.

=== Election debates ===
2023 Kaduna State gubernatorial election debates
Date	Organisers	P Present (Note: Denotes a party gubernatorial nominee attending the event.) S Surrogate (Note: Denotes a party gubernatorial nominee not attending the event, sending a surrogate in their place.) NI Not invited A Absent invitee W Invitation withdrawn						
Date	Organisers	ADP	APC	LP	NNPP	PDP	Other parties	Ref.
18 January	BBC Hausa	W Sha'aban	P Sani	A Asake	P Othman Hunkuyi	P Ashiru	NI; Multiple	

== Projections ==
Source	Projection	As of
Africa Elects (Note: AfricaElects projections predict the likelihood of a candidate winning a state by categorizing a state as "Safe" for exceedingly likely, "Likely" for somewhat likely, and "Lean" for least likely. If no clear determination could be made, states are categorized as "tossups".)	Lean Ashiru	17 March 2023
Enough is Enough- SBM Intelligence (Note: EiE-SBM projections predict which candidates will win states.)	Ashiru	2 March 2023

== Conduct ==
=== Electoral timetable ===
On 26 February 2022, the Independent National Electoral Commission released the timetable, setting out key dates and deadlines for the election. Months later on 27 May 2022, INEC made a slight revision to the timetable, allowing parties extra time to conduct primaries.

- 28 February 2022 – Publication of Notice of Election
- 4 April 2022 – First day for the conduct of party primaries
- 9 June 2022 (Note: The original deadline was 3 June; however, INEC pushed it back to 9 June at the behest of parties.) – Final day for the conduct of party primaries, including the resolution of disputes arising from them
- 1 July 2022 – First day for submission of nomination forms to INEC via the online portal
- 15 July 2022 – Final day for submission of nomination forms to INEC via the online portal
- 12 October 2022 – Commencement of the official campaign period
- 16 March 2023 (Note: The original deadline was 9 March; however, INEC pushed it back to 16 March.) – Final day of the official campaign period

=== Pre-election ===
Due to widespread insecurity in the state, civil society groups raised concern about the safe conduct of the election in heavily insecure areas.

== General election ==
=== Results ===
2023 Kaduna State gubernatorial election
Party	Candidate	Votes	%
AA	Timothy Sherman Adamu		
ADP	Yusuf Jibril		
APP	Yahaya Musa Kallah		
ADC	Caleb Zagi		
APM	Yahaya Alhassan		
APC	Uba Sani		
APGA	Andrew Abui Duya		
LP	Jonathan Asake		
New Nigeria Peoples Party	Suleiman Othman Hunkuyi		
NRM	Salihu Abubakar Gambo		
PDP	Isa Ashiru		
PRP	Hayatuddeen Lawal		
SDP	Adamu Abubakar Idris		
YPP	Yaya Sanin Yaya		
Total votes			100.00%
Invalid or blank votes			N/A
Turnout			

==== By senatorial district ====
The results of the election by senatorial district.

Senatorial District	Uba Sani APC		Jonathan Asake LP		Isa Ashiru PDP		Others		Total Valid Votes
Senatorial District	Votes	Percentage	Votes	Percentage	Votes	Percentage	Votes	Percentage	Total Valid Votes
Kaduna Central Senatorial District (Note: Comprising the local government areas of Birnin Gwari, Chikun, Giwa, Igabi, Kaduna North, Kaduna South, and Kajuru.)	TBD	%	TBD	%	TBD	%	TBD	%	TBD
Kaduna North Senatorial District (Note: Comprising the local government areas of Ikara, Kubau, Kudan, Lere, Makarfi, Sabon Gari, Soba, and Zaria.)	TBD	%	TBD	%	TBD	%	TBD	%	TBD
Kaduna South Senatorial District (Note: Comprising the local government areas of Jaba, Jema'a, Kachia, Kagarko, Kaura, Kauru, Sanga, and Zangon Kataf.)	TBD	%	TBD	%	TBD	%	TBD	%	TBD
Totals	TBD	%	TBD	%	TBD	%	TBD	%	TBD

==== By federal constituency ====
The results of the election by federal constituency.

Federal Constituency	Uba Sani APC		Jonathan Asake LP		Isa Ashiru PDP		Others		Total Valid Votes
Federal Constituency	Votes	Percentage	Votes	Percentage	Votes	Percentage	Votes	Percentage	Total Valid Votes
Birnin Gwari/Giwa Federal Constituency (Note: Comprising the local government areas of Birnin Gwari and Giwa.)	TBD	%	TBD	%	TBD	%	TBD	%	TBD
Chikun/Kajuru Federal Constituency (Note: Comprising the local government areas of Chikun and Kajuru.)	TBD	%	TBD	%	TBD	%	TBD	%	TBD
Igabi Federal Constituency (Note: Comprising the local government area of Igabi.)	TBD	%	TBD	%	TBD	%	TBD	%	TBD
Ikara/Kubau Federal Constituency (Note: Comprising the local government areas of Ikara and Kubau.)	TBD	%	TBD	%	TBD	%	TBD	%	TBD
Jema'a/Sanga Federal Constituency (Note: Comprising the local government areas of Jema'a and Sanga.)	TBD	%	TBD	%	TBD	%	TBD	%	TBD
Kachia/Kagarko Federal Constituency (Note: Comprising the local government areas of Kachia and Kagarko.)	TBD	%	TBD	%	TBD	%	TBD	%	TBD
Kaduna North Federal Constituency (Note: Comprising the local government area of Kaduna North.)	TBD	%	TBD	%	TBD	%	TBD	%	TBD
Kaduna South Federal Constituency (Note: Comprising the local government area of Kaduna South.)	TBD	%	TBD	%	TBD	%	TBD	%	TBD
Kaura Federal Constituency (Note: Comprising the local government area of Kaura.)	TBD	%	TBD	%	TBD	%	TBD	%	TBD
Kauru Federal Constituency (Note: Comprising the local government area of Kauru.)	TBD	%	TBD	%	TBD	%	TBD	%	TBD
Lere Federal Constituency (Note: Comprising the local government area of Lere.)	TBD	%	TBD	%	TBD	%	TBD	%	TBD
Makarfi/Kudan Federal Constituency (Note: Comprising the local government areas of Kudan and Makarfi.)	TBD	%	TBD	%	TBD	%	TBD	%	TBD
Sabon Gari Federal Constituency (Note: Comprising the local government area of Sabon Gari.)	TBD	%	TBD	%	TBD	%	TBD	%	TBD
Soba Federal Constituency (Note: Comprising the local government area of Soba.)	TBD	%	TBD	%	TBD	%	TBD	%	TBD
Zangon Kataf/Jaba Federal Constituency (Note: Comprising the local government areas of Jaba and Zangon Kataf.)	TBD	%	TBD	%	TBD	%	TBD	%	TBD
Zaria Federal Constituency (Note: Comprising the local government area of Zaria.)	TBD	%	TBD	%	TBD	%	TBD	%	TBD
Totals	TBD	%	TBD	%	TBD	%	TBD	%	TBD

==== By local government area ====
The results of the election by local government area.

LGA	Uba Sani APC		Jonathan Asake LP		Isa Ashiru PDP		Others		Total Valid Votes	Turnout Percentage
LGA	Votes	Percentage	Votes	Percentage	Votes	Percentage	Votes	Percentage	Total Valid Votes	Turnout Percentage
Birnin Gwari	TBD	%	TBD	%	TBD	%	TBD	%	TBD	%
Chikun	TBD	%	TBD	%	TBD	%	TBD	%	TBD	%
Giwa	TBD	%	TBD	%	TBD	%	TBD	%	TBD	%
Igabi	TBD	%	TBD	%	TBD	%	TBD	%	TBD	%
Jaba	TBD	%	TBD	%	TBD	%	TBD	%	TBD	%
Jema'a	TBD	%	TBD	%	TBD	%	TBD	%	TBD	%
Kachia	TBD	%	TBD	%	TBD	%	TBD	%	TBD	%
Kaduna North	TBD	%	TBD	%	TBD	%	TBD	%	TBD	%
Kaduna South	TBD	%	TBD	%	TBD	%	TBD	%	TBD	%
Kagarko	TBD	%	TBD	%	TBD	%	TBD	%	TBD	%
Kajuru	TBD	%	TBD	%	TBD	%	TBD	%	TBD	%
Kaura	TBD	%	TBD	%	TBD	%	TBD	%	TBD	%
Kauru	TBD	%	TBD	%	TBD	%	TBD	%	TBD	%
Kubau	TBD	%	TBD	%	TBD	%	TBD	%	TBD	%
Kudan	TBD	%	TBD	%	TBD	%	TBD	%	TBD	%
Lere	TBD	%	TBD	%	TBD	%	TBD	%	TBD	%
Makarfi	TBD	%	TBD	%	TBD	%	TBD	%	TBD	%
Sabon Gari	TBD	%	TBD	%	TBD	%	TBD	%	TBD	%
Sanga	TBD	%	TBD	%	TBD	%	TBD	%	TBD	%
Soba	TBD	%	TBD	%	TBD	%	TBD	%	TBD	%
Zangon Kataf	TBD	%	TBD	%	TBD	%	TBD	%	TBD	%
Zaria	TBD	%	TBD	%	TBD	%	TBD	%	TBD	%
Totals	TBD	%	TBD	%	TBD	%	TBD	%	TBD	%

== See also ==
- 2023 Nigerian general election
- 2023 Nigerian gubernatorial elections
