= 2023 Nigerian presidential election in Kaduna State =

- 25 February 2023
- Registered: 4,335,208
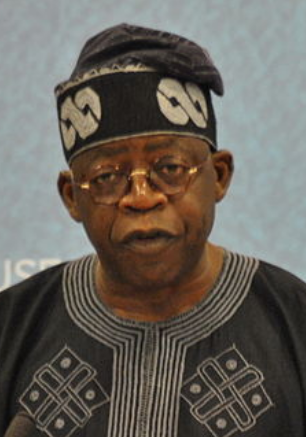

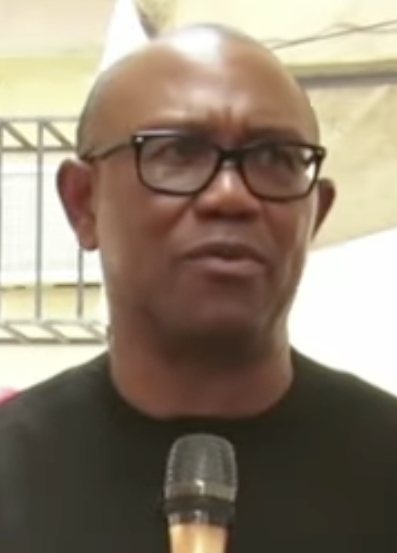

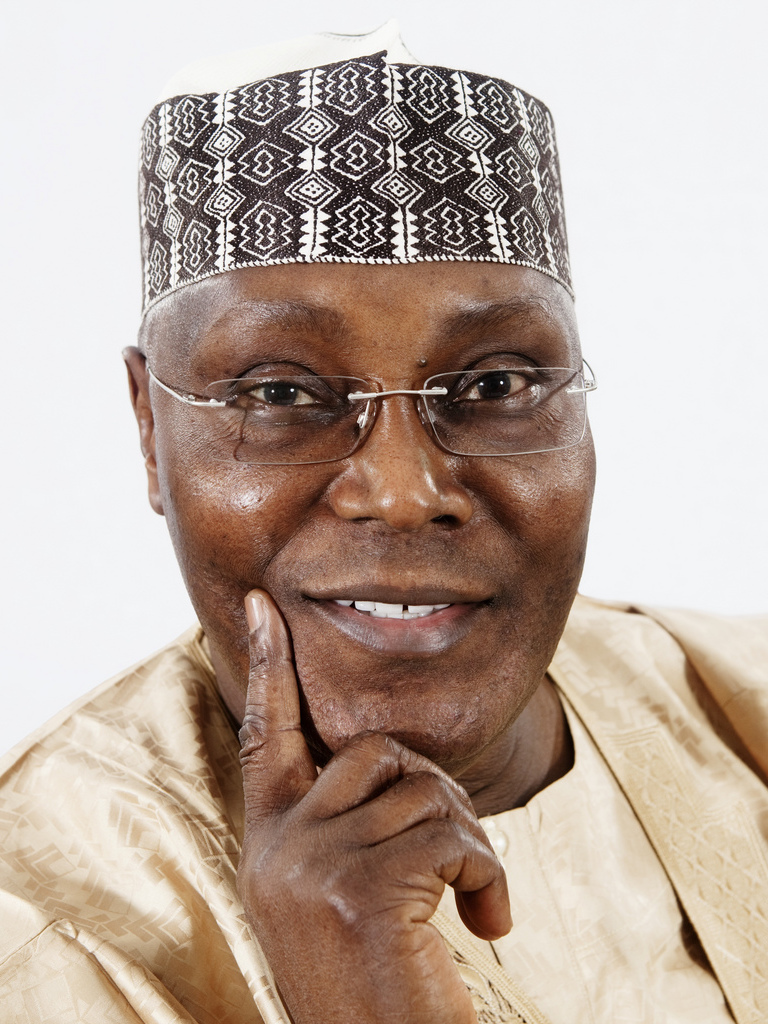
Nominee	Bola Tinubu	Peter Obi
Party	APC	LP
Home state	Lagos	Anambra
Running mate	Kashim Shettima	Yusuf Datti Baba-Ahmed
Nominee	Rabiu Kwankwaso	Atiku Abubakar
Party	New Nigeria Peoples Party	PDP
Home state	Kano	Adamawa
Running mate	Isaac Idahosa	Ifeanyi Okowa
President before election
Muhammadu Buhari
APC
Elected President
TBD

The 2023 Nigerian presidential election in Kaduna State will be held on 25 February 2023 as part of the nationwide 2023 Nigerian presidential election to elect the president and vice president of Nigeria. Other federal elections, including elections to the House of Representatives and the Senate, will also be held on the same date while state elections will be held two weeks afterward on 11 March.

== Background ==
Kaduna State is a large, diverse northwestern state with a growing economy and vast natural areas but facing an underdeveloped agricultural sector and intense challenges in security as the nationwide kidnapping epidemic, bandit conflict, inter-ethnic violence, and herder–farmer clashes have all heavily affected the state.

Politically, the 2019 elections were categorized as a slight solidification of the Kaduna APC's control as Governor Nasir Ahmad el-Rufai won re-election with over 55% of the vote and the party retained its House of Assembly majority. Federally, the APC regained two of the three Senate seats it lost due to defections and won eleven of the sixteen House of Representatives seats. For the presidency, Kaduna was won by APC nominee Muhammadu Buhari with about 60% but swung slightly towards the PDP. The 2019 elections also showed the political divide between the diverse, Christian-majority Southern region and the mainly Hausa and Fulani, Muslim-majority Northern and Central regions as the former region moved towards the PDP while the latter two regions stuck with the APC.

== Polling ==
Polling organisation/client	Fieldwork date	Sample size					Others	Undecided	Undisclosed	Not voting
Polling organisation/client	Fieldwork date	Sample size	Tinubu APC	Obi LP	Kwankwaso NNPP	Abubakar PDP	Others	Undecided	Undisclosed	Not voting
BantuPage	December 2022	N/A	17%	14%	8%	24%	–	33%	7%	7%
Nextier (Kaduna crosstabs of national poll)	27 January 2023	N/A	42.7%	22.6%	4.8%	29.0%	0.8%	–	–	–
SBM Intelligence for EiE (Kaduna crosstabs of national poll)	22 January-6 February 2023	N/A	11%	31%	12%	29%	–	17%	–	–

== Projections ==
Source	Projection		As of
Africa Elects (Note: Africa Elects projections predict the likelihood of a candidate winning a state by categorizing a state as "Safe" for exceedingly likely, "Likely" for somewhat likely, and "Lean" for least likely. If no clear determination could be made, states are categorized as "tossups".)	Tossup		24 February 2023
Dataphyte (Note: Dataphyte projections predict candidates' projected votal shares in each state.)
Dataphyte	Tinubu:	34.71%	11 February 2023
Dataphyte	Obi:	16.56%	11 February 2023
Dataphyte	Abubakar:	34.71%	11 February 2023
Dataphyte	Others:	14.02%	11 February 2023
Enough is Enough- SBM Intelligence (Note: EiE-SBM projections predict which candidates will win states.)	Abubakar		17 February 2023
SBM Intelligence (Note: SBM projections predict which candidates will win states or, if no determination could be made, categorizes states as "Too close to call" (TCC).)	Abubakar		15 December 2022
ThisDay (Note: ThisDay projections predict candidates' projected votal shares in each state.)
ThisDay	Tinubu:	30%	27 December 2022
ThisDay	Obi:	20%	27 December 2022
ThisDay	Kwankwaso:	20%	27 December 2022
ThisDay	Abubakar:	25%	27 December 2022
ThisDay	Others/Undecided:	5%	27 December 2022
The Nation (Note: The Nation projections predict which candidates will win states or, if no determination could be made, categorizes states as "Battlegrounds.")	Tinubu		12-19 February 2023

== General election ==
=== Results ===
2023 Nigerian presidential election in Kaduna State
Party	Candidate	Votes	%
A	Christopher Imumolen		
AA	Hamza al-Mustapha		
ADP	Yabagi Sani		
APP	Osita Nnadi		
AAC	Omoyele Sowore		
ADC	Dumebi Kachikwu		
APC	Bola Tinubu		
APGA	Peter Umeadi		
APM	Princess Chichi Ojei		
BP	Sunday Adenuga		
LP	Peter Obi		
NRM	Felix Johnson Osakwe		
New Nigeria Peoples Party	Rabiu Kwankwaso		
PRP	Kola Abiola		
PDP	Atiku Abubakar		
SDP	Adewole Adebayo		
YPP	Malik Ado-Ibrahim		
ZLP	Dan Nwanyanwu		
Total votes			100.00%
Invalid or blank votes			N/A
Turnout			

==== By senatorial district ====
The results of the election by senatorial district.

Senatorial District	Bola Tinubu APC		Atiku Abubakar PDP		Peter Obi LP		Rabiu Kwankwaso NNPP		Others		Total valid votes
Senatorial District	Votes	%	Votes	%	Votes	%	Votes	%	Votes	%	Total valid votes
Kaduna Central Senatorial District (Note: Comprising the local government areas of Birnin Gwari, Chikun, Giwa, Igabi, Kaduna North, Kaduna South, and Kajuru.)	TBD	%	TBD	%	TBD	%	TBD	%	TBD	%	TBD
Kaduna North Senatorial District (Note: Comprising the local government areas of Ikara, Kubau, Kudan, Lere, Makarfi, Sabon Gari, Soba, and Zaria.)	TBD	%	TBD	%	TBD	%	TBD	%	TBD	%	TBD
Kaduna South Senatorial District (Note: Comprising the local government areas of Jaba, Jema'a, Kachia, Kagarko, Kaura, Kauru, Sanga, and Zangon Kataf.)	TBD	%	TBD	%	TBD	%	TBD	%	TBD	%	TBD
Totals	TBD	%	TBD	%	TBD	%	TBD	%	TBD	%	TBD

==== By federal constituency ====
The results of the election by federal constituency.

Federal Constituency	Bola Tinubu APC		Atiku Abubakar PDP		Peter Obi LP		Rabiu Kwankwaso NNPP		Others		Total valid votes
Federal Constituency	Votes	%	Votes	%	Votes	%	Votes	%	Votes	%	Total valid votes
Birnin Gwari/Giwa Federal Constituency (Note: Comprising the local government areas of Birnin Gwari and Giwa.)	TBD	%	TBD	%	TBD	%	TBD	%	TBD	%	TBD
Chikun/Kajuru Federal Constituency (Note: Comprising the local government areas of Chikun and Kajuru.)	TBD	%	TBD	%	TBD	%	TBD	%	TBD	%	TBD
Igabi Federal Constituency (Note: Comprising the local government area of Igabi.)	TBD	%	TBD	%	TBD	%	TBD	%	TBD	%	TBD
Ikara/Kubau Federal Constituency (Note: Comprising the local government areas of Ikara and Kubau.)	TBD	%	TBD	%	TBD	%	TBD	%	TBD	%	TBD
Jema'a/Sanga Federal Constituency (Note: Comprising the local government areas of Jema'a and Sanga.)	TBD	%	TBD	%	TBD	%	TBD	%	TBD	%	TBD
Kachia/Kagarko Federal Constituency (Note: Comprising the local government areas of Kachia and Kagarko.)	TBD	%	TBD	%	TBD	%	TBD	%	TBD	%	TBD
Kaduna North Federal Constituency (Note: Comprising the local government area of Kaduna North.)	TBD	%	TBD	%	TBD	%	TBD	%	TBD	%	TBD
Kaduna South Federal Constituency (Note: Comprising the local government area of Kaduna South.)	TBD	%	TBD	%	TBD	%	TBD	%	TBD	%	TBD
Kaura Federal Constituency (Note: Comprising the local government area of Kaura.)	TBD	%	TBD	%	TBD	%	TBD	%	TBD	%	TBD
Kauru Federal Constituency (Note: Comprising the local government area of Kauru.)	TBD	%	TBD	%	TBD	%	TBD	%	TBD	%	TBD
Lere Federal Constituency (Note: Comprising the local government area of Lere.)	TBD	%	TBD	%	TBD	%	TBD	%	TBD	%	TBD
Makarfi/Kudan Federal Constituency (Note: Comprising the local government areas of Kudan and Makarfi.)	TBD	%	TBD	%	TBD	%	TBD	%	TBD	%	TBD
Sabon Gari Federal Constituency (Note: Comprising the local government area of Sabon Gari.)	TBD	%	TBD	%	TBD	%	TBD	%	TBD	%	TBD
Soba Federal Constituency (Note: Comprising the local government area of Soba.)	TBD	%	TBD	%	TBD	%	TBD	%	TBD	%	TBD
Zangon Kataf/Jaba Federal Constituency (Note: Comprising the local government areas of Jaba and Zangon Kataf.)	TBD	%	TBD	%	TBD	%	TBD	%	TBD	%	TBD
Zaria Federal Constituency (Note: Comprising the local government area of Zaria.)	TBD	%	TBD	%	TBD	%	TBD	%	TBD	%	TBD
Totals	TBD	%	TBD	%	TBD	%	TBD	%	TBD	%	TBD

==== By local government area ====
The results of the election by local government area.

Local government area	Bola Tinubu APC		Atiku Abubakar PDP		Peter Obi LP		Rabiu Kwankwaso NNPP		Others		Total valid votes	Turnout (%)
Local government area	Votes	%	Votes	%	Votes	%	Votes	%	Votes	%	Total valid votes	Turnout (%)
Birnin Gwari	TBD	%	TBD	%	TBD	%	TBD	%	TBD	%	TBD	%
Chikun	TBD	%	TBD	%	TBD	%	TBD	%	TBD	%	TBD	%
Giwa	TBD	%	TBD	%	TBD	%	TBD	%	TBD	%	TBD	%
Igabi	TBD	%	TBD	%	TBD	%	TBD	%	TBD	%	TBD	%
Jaba	TBD	%	TBD	%	TBD	%	TBD	%	TBD	%	TBD	%
Jema'a	TBD	%	TBD	%	TBD	%	TBD	%	TBD	%	TBD	%
Kachia	TBD	%	TBD	%	TBD	%	TBD	%	TBD	%	TBD	%
Kaduna North	TBD	%	TBD	%	TBD	%	TBD	%	TBD	%	TBD	%
Kaduna South	TBD	%	TBD	%	TBD	%	TBD	%	TBD	%	TBD	%
Kagarko	TBD	%	TBD	%	TBD	%	TBD	%	TBD	%	TBD	%
Kajuru	TBD	%	TBD	%	TBD	%	TBD	%	TBD	%	TBD	%
Kaura	TBD	%	TBD	%	TBD	%	TBD	%	TBD	%	TBD	%
Kauru	TBD	%	TBD	%	TBD	%	TBD	%	TBD	%	TBD	%
Kubau	TBD	%	TBD	%	TBD	%	TBD	%	TBD	%	TBD	%
Kudan	TBD	%	TBD	%	TBD	%	TBD	%	TBD	%	TBD	%
Lere	TBD	%	TBD	%	TBD	%	TBD	%	TBD	%	TBD	%
Makarfi	TBD	%	TBD	%	TBD	%	TBD	%	TBD	%	TBD	%
Sabon Gari	TBD	%	TBD	%	TBD	%	TBD	%	TBD	%	TBD	%
Sanga	TBD	%	TBD	%	TBD	%	TBD	%	TBD	%	TBD	%
Soba	TBD	%	TBD	%	TBD	%	TBD	%	TBD	%	TBD	%
Zangon Kataf	TBD	%	TBD	%	TBD	%	TBD	%	TBD	%	TBD	%
Zaria	TBD	%	TBD	%	TBD	%	TBD	%	TBD	%	TBD	%
Totals	TBD	%	TBD	%	TBD	%	TBD	%	TBD	%	TBD	%

== See also ==
- 2023 Kaduna State elections
- 2023 Nigerian presidential election
