= 2015 Kaduna State gubernatorial election =

2015 gubernatorial election in Kaduna State, Nigeria

- (Nigeria)
- April 11, 2015
- Turnout: 0.51
Nominee	Nasir Ahmad el-Rufai	Mukhtar Ramalan Yero
Party	APC	PDP
Running mate	Yusuf Barnabas Bala	Nuhu Nyam Audu Bajoga
Popular vote	1,117,635	485,833
Percentage	68.56%	29.80%
Governor before election
Mukhtar Ramalan Yero
PDP
Elected Governor
Nasir Ahmad el-Rufai
APC

The 2015 Kaduna State gubernatorial election occurred on April 11, 2015. Nasir el-Rufai of the APC took a clear lead against the incumbent governor and PDP, Mukhtar Ramalan Yero candidate in the election. The APC candidate won in 17 LGAs, while the PDP claimed the other six.

Earlier on, in January 2015, in a pre-election poll for the Kaduna gubernatorial elections organised by the ANAP Foundation, the result showed el-Rufai leading Yero by a gap of 26% in-between them; the former having 46% of total votes, and the latter 20%. 23% of the voters, however, remained indecisive.

Nasir Ahmad el-Rufai emerged winner in the APC gubernatorial primary election. His running mate was Yusuf Barnabas Bala.

== Electoral system ==
The Governor of Kaduna State is elected using the plurality voting system.

== Primary election ==
=== APC primary ===
The APC primary election began Thursday, December 4, 2014, ending early on Friday December 5, when results were announced at about 8:30 AM at the Kaduna International Trade Fair Complex where the event was held. Nasir el-Rufai overcame four other contenders, polling 1,965 votes to become the winner of the contest. There were a total of 3,557 accredited delegates, 3,546 total vote cast of which 3,518 were valid and 28 invalid, as reported the returning officer, Prince Ekenyem Orizu.

=== Candidates ===
- Party nominee: Nasir el-Rufai: Winner (1,965 votes)
- Running mate:
- Isah Ashiru: Runner-up (1,379 votes)
- Haruna Saeed: 2nd Runner-up (127 votes)
- Shamshudeen Abdullahi Ango: 3rd Runner-up (25 votes)
- Salihu Mohammed Lukman: 4th Runner-up (22 votes)

=== PDP primary ===
The PDP primary election was held at Murtala Square Kaduna on December 7, 2014. After all but one of the other aspirants stepped down for him, Mukhtar Ramalan Yero, the incumbent governor emerged with the highest votes, polling 970, while his only contender, Senator Haruna Aziz Zego, got a lone vote, out of a total of 972 delegate votes.

=== Candidates ===
- Party nominee: Mukhtar Ramalan Yero: Incumbent governor.
- Running mate:
- Haruna Zego: Runner-up
- Ajeye Bako: Withdrew
- Lawal Yakawada: Withdrew
- Felix Hyatt: Withdrew

== Results ==
A total of 14 candidates registered with the Independent National Electoral Commission to contest in the election. The PDP candidate scored the highest, polling a total of 1,117,635 votes to oust the APC contestant and incumbent governor, who emerged second with 485,833 votes, while the APGA candidate came third, with 20,140 votes. There were 3,357,469 registered voters across the state, out of which 1,710,935 were accredited, but just 1,660,109 voted, according to the INEC Returning Officer.

Candidate	Party	Votes	%
Nasir el-Rufai	All Progressives Congress (APC)	1,117,635	68.56
Mukhtar Ramalan Yero	People's Democratic Party (PDP)	485,833	29.80
Polycarp Danladi Gankon	All Progressives Grand Alliance (APGA)	20,140	1.24
Muhammadu Ribadu	African Peoples Alliance (APA)	2,621	0.16
Alhaji Kabir Ahmed Jibril	Progressive Peoples Alliance (PPA)	966	0.06
Alhaji Nayaya Mohammed Lawal	People for Democratic Change (PDC)	923	0.06
Bala Mohammed Yunusa	African Democratic Congress (ADC)	676	0.04
Isa Adamu Abdullahi	National Conscience Party (NCP)	321	0.02
Garba Muhammed Suleiman	Allied Congress Party of Nigeria (ACPN)	281	0.02
Nehemiah Sunday	United Democratic Party (UDP)	187	0.01
Sani Abdulkadir	New Nigeria Peoples Party (NNPP)	170	0.01
Abdul Ahmed Isiaq	Social Democratic Party (SDP)	123	0.01
Alhaji Lawal Yusuf	United Party of Nigeria (UPN)	109	0.01
Mohammed Sani Ahmed	Peoples Party of Nigeria (PPN)	95	0.01
Total		1,630,080	100.00
Registered voters/turnout		3,357,469	–
Source: Channels TV, Google, The Cable

=== By local government area ===
The results of the election by local government area are here, representing the two major contenders. The total valid votes of 1,629,157 represents the 14 political parties that participated in the election. Green represents LGAs won by Yero. Blue represents LGAs won by el-Rufai.

County (LGA)	Nasir Ahmad el-Rufai APC		Mukhtar Ramalan Yero PDP		Total votes
County (LGA)	#	%	#	%	#
Birnin Gwari					
Chikun	36,920		27,248		
Giwa	48,248		14,197		
Igabi	88,361		20,180		
Ikara	37,521		16,836		
Jaba					
Jema'a	39,760		45,272		
Kachia					
Kaduna North	106,915		12,465		
Kaduna South	120,535		15,665		
Kagarko	24,846		15,413		
Kajuru	18,522		21,296		
Kaura	37,521		16,836		
Kauru					
Kubau	53,934		14,034		
Kudan					
Lere					
Makarfi	37,759		11,084		
Sabon Gari	61,107		12,504		
Sanga					
Soba	55,836		12,743		
Zangon Kataf					
Zaria					
Totals	1,117,635		485,833		1,629,157
