= 2019 Kaduna State gubernatorial election =

2019 gubernatorial election in Kaduna State, Nigeria

- (Nigeria)
- March 9, 2019
- Turnout: 48.05%
Party	APC	PDP
Popular vote	1,045,427	814,168
Percentage	55.32%	43.08%
Governor before election
Nasir Ahmad el-Rufai
APC
Elected Governor
Nasir Ahmad el-Rufai
APC

The 2019 Kaduna State gubernatorial election occurred on March 9, 2019. APC candidate Nasir Ahmad el-Rufai defeated main opposition party PDP's candidate, Isah Ashiru, to emerge winner of the contest. APC was said to have won 14 LGAs, PDP nine.

Nasir Ahmad el-Rufai emerged winner in the APC gubernatorial primary election unopposed. His running mate was Hadiza Sabuwa Balarabe.

Of the 38 candidates who contested in the election, 36 were male, two were female.

== Electoral system ==
The Governor of Kaduna State is elected using a modified two-round system. Under Section 179 of the Constitution of Nigeria, a candidate is elected governor if they receive the highest number of votes cast and at least one-quarter of the votes cast in each of at least two-thirds of all the local government areas in the state.

If no candidate satisfies both requirements, a second election is held in accordance with Section 179 of the Constitution between the leading candidates meeting the constitutional requirements.

== Primary election ==
=== APC primary ===
The APC primary election was held at Murtala Square, Kaduna. El-Rufai was declared the winner of the contest unopposed, with a total score of 2,447. However, there were a total of 33 invalid votes, according to the committee chairman of the elections, Mr Matthew Iduoriyekemwen. A total of 3,782 delegates participated in the election from across the 23 LGAs if the state.

=== Candidates ===
- Party nominee: Nasir Ahmad el-Rufai: Sole contestant (2,447 votes)
- Running mate:Hadiza Sabuwa Balarabe.

=== PDP primary ===
The PDP primary election was kick-started at exactly 2:57 PM at the Kaduna International Trade Fair Complex on Sunday September 30, 2018, and concluded on Monday October 1. Isah Ashiru Kudan, who earlier contested in the 2014 APC primary elections for the 2015 Kaduna gubernatorial election coming out first runner-up, emerged victorious as the PDP flag-bearer for the 2019 Kaduna State gubernatorial election. There were 2,654 delegates from 20 of the 23 LGAs present at the 2018 PDP Kaduna gubernatorial Primaries, whose 39 votes were declared invalid. There were a total of 10 aspirants, two of which withdrew in the process.

=== Candidates ===
- Party nominee: Isah Ashiru Kudan: Winner (1,330 votes).
- Running mate: Sunday Marshall Katung.
- Mohammed Sani Sidi: 1st Runner-up (569 votes)
- Senator Suleiman Othman Hunkuyi: 2nd Runner-up (564 votes)
- Mukhtar Ramalan Yero: 3rd Runner-up (36 votes)
- Shuaibi Miqati: 4th Runner-up (16 votes)
- Jonathan Kish Adamu: 5th Runner-up (2 votes)
- Dauda Ahmadu Ibrahim: (0 votes)
- Muhammad Sani Bello: (0 votes)
- Ja’afaru Sa’ad: Withdrew
- Muhammed Bello Umar: Withdrew

== Results ==
The election was contested by 38 candidates. Nasir Ahmad el-Rufai, the incumbent governor and candidate of the All Progressives Congress (APC), was declared the winner by the Independent National Electoral Commission (INEC), receiving 1,045,427 votes. Isah Ashiru of the Peoples Democratic Party (PDP) finished second with 814,168 votes. El-Rufai therefore won by a margin of 231,259 votes.

El-Rufai won 14 of the state's 23 local government areas, while Ashiru won nine. El-Rufai won the election with 55.32% of the valid votes, compared with 43.08% for Ashiru.

There were 3,932,492 registered voters in Kaduna State for the 2019 general elections. The valid votes cast in the governorship election totalled 1,889,714, representing approximately 48.05% of registered voters.

Candidate	Party	Votes	%
Nasir Ahmad el-Rufai	All Progressives Congress (APC)	1,045,427	55.32
Isah Ashiru	People's Democratic Party (PDP)	814,168	43.08
Haruna Saeed	Social Democratic Party (SDP)	9,828	0.52
Ahmad Tijjani Omar	People's Redemption Party (PRP)	5,626	0.30
Polycarp Danladi Gankon	All Progressives Grand Alliance (APGA)	2,405	0.13
Sani Abdulkadir	New Nigeria People's Party (NNPP)	2,025	0.11
Othman Mustapha Bakano	African Peoples Alliance (APA)	1,987	0.11
Muhammad Kabir Uthman	Mega Party of Nigeria (MPN)	1,533	0.08
Muhammed Aliyu Galadima	National Rescue Movement (NRM)	1,151	0.06
Ibrahim Suleiman	African Democratic Congress (ADA)	1,011	0.05
Abubakar Aliyu	Change Advocacy Party (CAP)	663	0.04
Kabir Ahmed Jibril	Progressive Peoples Party (PPA)	594	0.03
Solomon Yahaya Ikagwu	Nigeria People's Congress (NPC)	449	0.02
Metoh H. Yakubu	All Grassroots Party (AGA)	324	0.02
Abdullahi Awwal Aliyu	United Democratic Party (UDP)	316	0.02
Ahmad Muhammad	Green Party of Nigeria (GPN)	238	0.01
Salim Muhammad	African Peoples Party (APP)	162	0.01
Emmanuel Parah Bako	National Conscience Party (NCP)	162	0.01
Adamu Idris Chado	Democratic Peoples Congress (DPC)	157	0.01
Shehu Abubakar	People's Party of Nigeria (PPN)	147	0.01
Aminu Sabo	Alliance for New Nigeria (ANN)	133	0.01
Umar Ibrahim Farouk	Labour Party (LP)	125	0.01
Mansur Suleiman	Nigeria Elements Progressive Party (NEPP)	121	0.01
Umar Uba	National Interest Party (NIP)	102	0.01
Yahaya Alhassan Marafa	Unity Party of Nigeria (UPN)	99	0.01
Jamilu Mohammad	Accord (A)	97	0.01
Shika Rabiatu Sulaiman	National Action Council (NAC)	88	0.00
Muhammad Fatima Binta	Restoration Party of Nigeria (RP)	86	0.00
Umar Suleiman	Democratic Alternative (DA)	74	0.00
Suleiman Abdulrasheed	Masses Movement of Nigeria (MMN)	68	0.00
Abubakar Abdullahi	Zenith Labour Party (ZLP)	67	0.00
Ahmad Rabiu Bello	Hope Democratic Party (HDP)	66	0.00
Muhammed Jibrin Muntaka	Independent Democrats (ID)	58	0.00
Halliru Tafida Abdullahi	Movement for the Restoration and Defence of Democracy (MRDD)	52	0.00
Ezekiel Habila	Liberation Movement (LM)	36	0.00
Iliyasu Aminu Mustapha	Action Alliance (AA)	32	0.00
Yusuf Abdulfatai	We The People Nigeria (WTPN)	23	0.00
Muhammed Umar	Justice Must Prevail Party (JMPP)	14	0.00
Total		1,889,714	100.00
Registered voters/turnout		3,932,492	–
Source: INEC

=== By local government area ===
A total of 38 political parties were reported by the News Agency of Nigeria (NAN) to have aspirants for the Kaduna State Governorship poll. The results of the election by local government area, representing the two major contenders are presented here below. Green represents LGAs won by Ashiru. Blue represents LGAs won by el-Rufai.

== Withdrawals and endorsements ==
In the final days of the campaign, several minor-party candidates announced their support for the two major candidates. On 1 March 2019, the governorship candidates of the All Progressives Grand Alliance (APGA), Polycarp Gankon, and the Liberation Movement, Nigeria (LM), Ezekiel Habila, withdrew from the race and endorsed the Peoples Democratic Party (PDP) candidate, Isah Ashiru.

Three days later, 32 other governorship candidates announced their support for the incumbent governor, Nasir Ahmad el-Rufai, who was seeking re-election on the platform of the All Progressives Congress. The candidates represented a number of smaller political parties and described their decision as an endorsement of el-Rufai's candidacy ahead of the election.

== Legal challenges ==
The Peoples Democratic Party and its governorship candidate, Isah Ashiru, challenged the election result at the Kaduna State Governorship Election Petition Tribunal. The petitioners alleged irregularities and over-voting and sought, among other reliefs, a recount of votes cast in the election.

On 28 May 2019, the tribunal rejected an application by the PDP and Ashiru for a recount of the votes. The tribunal held that it could not grant the application in the form presented and struck out the motion.

On 9 September 2019, the election petition tribunal dismissed the substantive petition and upheld Nasir Ahmad el-Rufai's election. The tribunal held that the petitioners had failed to establish their allegations of electoral irregularities and that there was insufficient evidence to overturn the result declared by the Independent National Electoral Commission (INEC).

Ashiru appealed the tribunal's decision to the Court of Appeal. In November 2019, the Court of Appeal dismissed the appeal and affirmed the tribunal's decision upholding el-Rufai's election.

On 18 December 2019, the Supreme Court unanimously dismissed Ashiru's appeal and affirmed the judgment of the Court of Appeal, thereby upholding el-Rufai's election as Governor of Kaduna State.

County (LGA)	Nasir Ahmad el-Rufai APC		Isah Ashiru PDP		Total votes
County (LGA)	#	%	#	%	#
Birnin Gwari	32,292		16,901		
Chikun	24,262		86,251		
Giwa	51,455		19,834		
Igabi	102,612		31,429		
Ikara	41,969		22,553		
Jaba	6,298		22,976		
Jema'a	21,265		63,129		
Kachia	30,812		51,780		
Kaduna North	97,243		27,665		
Kaduna South	102,035		37,948		
Kagarko	21,982		26,643		
Kajuru	10,229		34,658		
Kaura	8,342		38,764		
Kauru	34,844		31,928		
Kubau	57,182		17,074		
Kudan	28,624		22,022		
Lere	71,056		45,215		
Makarfi	34,956		22,301		
Sabon Gari	57,655		25,519		
Sanga	20,806		21,226		
Soba	55,046		25,440		
Zangon Kataf	13,448		87,546		
Zaria	111,014		35,356		
Totals					
