= Ahmed Makarfi =

Nigerian politician (born 1956)

Senator for Kaduna North
- In office 14 November 2011 – 6 June 2015
- Preceded by: Yusuf Datti Baba-Ahmed
- Succeeded by: Suleiman Othman Hunkuyi
- In office 5 June 2007 – 6 June 2011
- Preceded by: Dalhatu Tafida
- Succeeded by: Yusuf Datti Baba-Ahmed

Governor of Kaduna State
- In office 29 May 1999 – 29 May 2007
- Deputy: Stephen Shekari (1999–2005); Patrick Yakowa (2005–2007)
- Preceded by: Umar Farouk Ahmed
- Succeeded by: Namadi Sambo

Personal details
- Born: Ahmed Mohammed Makarfi; 8 August 1956 (age 69) Makarfi, Northern Region, British Nigeria (now in Kaduna State, Nigeria)
- Party: Peoples Democratic Party
- Children: 5
- Occupation: Politician

Ahmed Mohammed Makarfi (born 8 August 1956) is a Nigerian politician who is a former chairman of the Peoples Democratic Party. He was governor of Kaduna State from 29 May 1999 to 29 May 2007, and was elected Senator for Kaduna North senatorial district in April 2007. He is a member of the Peoples Democratic Party (PDP).

== Early life and education ==
Born in Makarfi, Makarfi Local Government Area of Kaduna State (then part of the Northern Region), he attended primary school from 1965 to 1973. He then attended the Federal Government College Enugu from 1973 to 1978. In 1979, Makarfi was admitted to the School of Basic Studies at Ahmadu Bello University in Zaria where he obtained a Bachelor of Science degree in Accounting. He was a part-time Lecturer in the Department of Accounting from 1987 to 1993. During this time, he received a Master of Science degree in Accounting and Finance.

== Career ==
Makarfi started his working career at the Nigeria Universal Bank, where he rose to the rank of Assistant General Manager. He held many ad hoc responsibilities during this period. In 1994, he was appointed to the Kaduna State Executive Council as Honorable Commissioner of Finance and Economic Planning before returning to the private sector.

He became a member of the Board of Trustees at the Institute for Peace and Conflict Resolution in Abuja as well as its Director of Finance and Administration.

Makarfi was elected governor of Kaduna State in 1999 and won a second four-year term in 2003. In April 2007, he was elected Senator in the Nigerian Senate representing Kaduna North Senatorial District (which includes Makarfi, Kudan, Sabon gari, Zaria, Ikara, Soba, Lere and Kubau Local Government Areas). In the April 2011 elections, Makarfi ran for reelection on the PDP platform and was elected. In 2016, Makarfi was appointed PDP national Chairman at a Convention held in Port Harcourt.

== PDP Crisis ==
In 2017, Makarfi was removed as PDP Chairman and Ali Modu Sheriff was declared chairman, but after a five-man Apex Court verdict, Makarfi was reinstated as National PDP Chairman.

In June 2018, Makarfi declared that he was joining "capable party men and women" in the contest for the main opposition's presidential nomination for the 2019 general election. He said it was only fair he joins the race after a wide consultation with his party's men and women and other stakeholders. Makarfi was one of the 12 candidates that contested for the PDP nomination at a convention held in Port Harcourt on 6 November 2018. Of the 12 candidates that ran for the nomination, four candidates including Makarfi himself were from North Western states. Aminu Tambuwal (Sokoto State), Rabiu Kwankwaso (Kano State), Attahiru Bafarawa (Sokoto State) are the other candidates form the region. Analysts predicted that the huge number of candidates from the region would split delegate votes from the region among the contestants giving advantage to popular candidates from other regions over them. In the PDP primary, Makarfi clinched a distant 5th position behind Atiku Abubakar the winner of the election. The disappointing result from the primary ended his presidential run in 2019.

== See also ==
- List of governors of Kaduna State
