= Kaduna Metropolitan Authorities =

Metropolitan Authority in Nigeria

The Kaduna Metropolitan Authorities in Kaduna State, Nigeria were originally known as local government or native authorities. The local government authorities were established during British colonial rule in Nigeria. The local government authority was headed by a district head. The authority was established to manage taxation, the production of cash crops, and their export to Britain. The authority in Kaduna City became obsolete in 1979, however, it was reintroduced in 2021 during Governor Nasir Ahmad El-Rufai's administration.

== Current metropolitan authorities ==
The current metropolitan authorities were created in 2021 by Governor Nasir Ahmad El-Rufai to administer support for infrastructural and economic growth in densely populated Local Government Districts in Kaduna State. The districts covered are Kaduna city, Zaria, and Kafanchan.

== Metropolitan Authority Administrators ==
The metropolitan authorities are headed by Administrators. Who are at the levels of Commissioners The present administrator of Kaduna Capital Territory Authority is Samuel Aruwan. The administrator for the Zaria Metropolitan Authority is Balaraba Aliyu-Inuwa while the Kafanchan Municipal Authority is headed by Phoebe Sukai Yayi.

== Local Government Areas covered by Metropolitan Authorities ==
Metropolitan Authority	Local Government Area (LGA)	Number	Population of LGAs
Kaduna Capital Territory	Kaduna North, Kaduna South, Chikun, Igabi	4	1,187,000
Zaria	Zaria, Sabon Gari, Giwa, Soba	4	766,000
Kafanchan Municipal	Jema'a, Kaura and Zango Kataf	1	1, 094,801

== See also ==
- Kaduna
