= 2007 Kaduna State gubernatorial election =

2007 gubernatorial election in Kaduna State, Nigeria

- (Nigeria)
- April 14, 2007
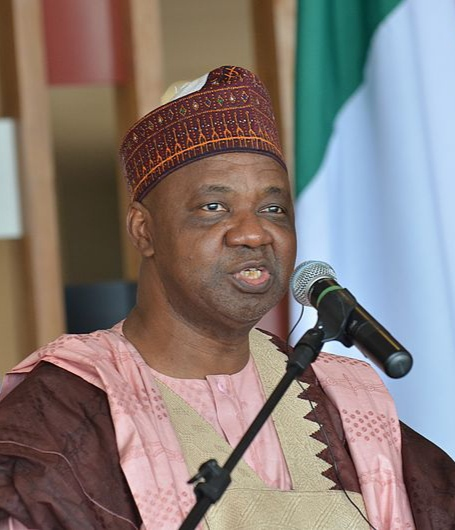

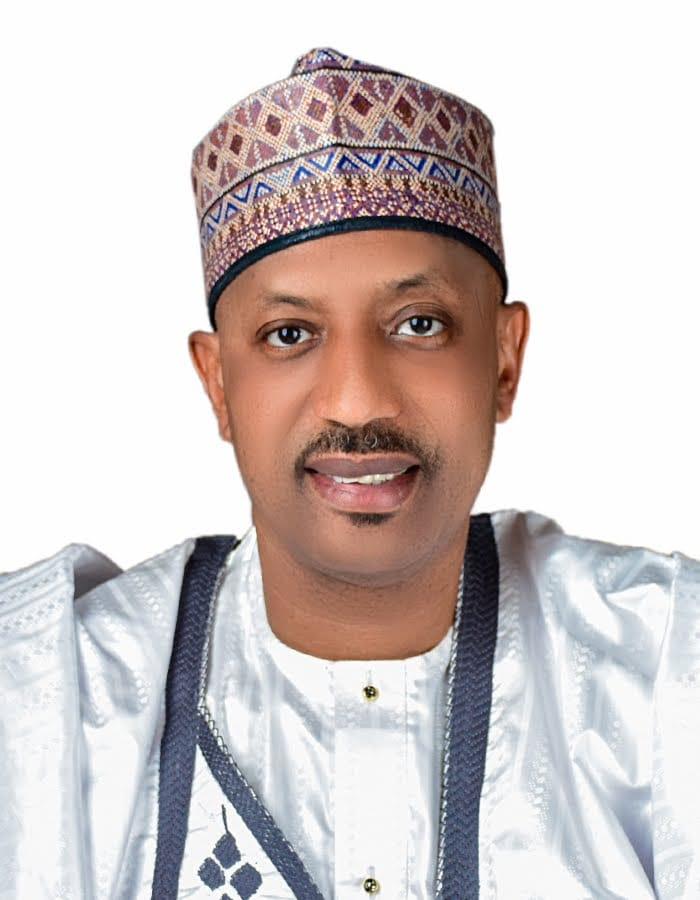
Nominee	Mohammed Namadi Sambo	Sani Muhammed Sha'aban
Party	PDP	ANPP
Running mate	Patrick Ibrahim Yakowa	Joel Giwa Kwasu
Popular vote	1,326,632	478,725
Governor before election
Ahmed Makarfi
PDP
Elected Governor
Namadi Sambo
PDP

The 2007 Kaduna State gubernatorial election occurred on April 14, 2007. Namadi Sambo of the PDP defeated other candidates by polling 1,326,632 popular votes, ANPP's Sani Muhammed Sha'aban was closest contender with 478,725 votes and AC's Muhammad Suleman Zantu scoring 109,415 votes.

Namadi Sambo emerged winner in the PDP gubernatorial primary election. His running mate was Patrick Ibrahim Yakowa.

Of the 17 candidates who contested in the election, all were male, without any female aspirants. Only but one deputy governorship candidate, Jummai Tanko, was female contesting under NCP alongside Isa Adamu Abdullahi, vying for governorship.

== Electoral system ==
The Governor of Kaduna State is elected using the plurality voting system.

== Primary election ==
=== PDP primary ===
A run-off election was organized for the PDP governorship primary election, held on December 12, 2006, when no aspirant could emerge victorious at the first ballot in which Arc. Namadi Sambo came topmost with 2,379 votes, followed by Sen. Isaiah Balat with 1,493 votes.

=== Candidates ===
- Party nominee: Namadi Sambo: 2,379 votes
- Running mate: Patrick Ibrahim Yakowa:(Incumbent deputy governor): 252 votes
- Isaiah Balat: 1,493 votes
- Suleiman Othman Hunkuyi: 1,226 votes
- Lawal Yakawada: 309 votes
- Falalu Bello: 220 votes
- Shuaib Idris Mikati: 126 votes
- Garba Madaki Ali: 81 votes

== Results ==
A total of 17 candidates registered with the Independent National Electoral Commission to contest in the election. The PDP candidate won, defeating ANPP's Hon. Sani Mohammed Sha'aban, and 15 other minor party candidates.

The total number of registered voters in the state was 3,374,245.

Candidate	Party	Votes	%
Sani Sha'aban	All Nigeria Peoples Party (ANPP)		
Yusuf Abubakar Sadiq	Nigeria Advance Party (NAP)		
Muhammad Suleiman Zantu	Action Congress (AC)		
Mataimaki Tom Maiyashi	People's Redemption Party (PRP)		
Kabir Mohammed	African Democratic Congress (ADC)		
Bawa Barde	Democratic Alternative (DA)		
Suleiman Ahmed Akasawua	Northern People's Congress (NPC)		
Sirajo Salihu Awai	Masses Movement of Nigeria (MMN)		
Baba Jibrin Adamu	New Democrats (ND)		
Rabo Barde	United Nigeria People's Party (UNPP)		
Isa Adamu Abdullahi	National Conscience Party (NCP)		
Mohammed Namadi Sambo	People's Democratic Party (PDP)		
Thaddeus L. Ashei	Democratic People's Party (DPP)		
Ahmed Tijani Suleiman	Progressive Peoples Alliance (PPA)		
Mohammed Sagir Auwal	All Progressives Grand Alliance (APGA)		
Abdulrazak Adamu Kazaure	Movement for the Restoration and Defence of Democracy (MRDD)		
Kareke Sunday	Better Nigeria Progressive Party (BNPP)		
Total			
Registered voters/turnout		3,374,245	–
Source: INEC
