= 2011 Kaduna State gubernatorial election =

2011 gubernatorial election in Kaduna State, Nigeria

- (Nigeria)
- April 28, 2011
- Turnout: 66.18%
Nominee	Patrick Ibrahim Yakowa	Haruna Saeed Kajuru
Party	PDP	CPC
Running mate	Mukhtar Ramalan Yero
Popular vote	1,334,319	1,133,564
Percentage	52.34%	44.46%
Governor before election
Patrick Ibrahim Yakowa (incumbent)
PDP
Elected Governor
Patrick Ibrahim Yakowa (reelected)
PDP

The 2011 Kaduna State gubernatorial election occurred on April 28, 2011, after a two-day delay due to security concerns. Of the over five political parties contesting, just two were formidable, the PDP and newly formed CPC. The PDP candidate and incumbent governor, Patrick Ibrahim Yakowa, defeated Haruna Saeed of CPC and 12 others, polling 52.34% of the total valid votes.

Patrick Ibrahim Yakowa emerged winner in the PDP gubernatorial primary election. He retained Mukhtar Ramalan Yero as his running mate.

== Electoral system ==
The Governor of Kaduna State is elected using the plurality voting system.

== Results ==
A total of 14 candidates registered with the Independent National Electoral Commission to contest in the election. The PDP candidate won with a total valid vote of 1,334,319 ballots representing 52.36% of the total votes, closely followed by the CPC candidate who polled 1,133,564 ballot votes representing 44.46% of the total vote cast. ANPP got 33,142 votes, PRP 21,200 votes, and ACN 20,094 votes.

Candidate	Party	Votes	%
Patrick Ibrahim Yakowa	People's Democratic Party (PDP)	1,334,319	52.34
Haruna Saeed Kajuru	Congress for Progressive Change (CPC)	1,133,564	44.46
Muhammed Muktar Aruwa	All Nigeria Peoples Party (ANPP)	33,142	1.30
Abdulkadir Balarabe Musa	People's Redemption Party (PRP)	21,200	0.83
Sani Mohammed Sha'aban	Action Congress of Nigeria (ACN)	20,094	0.79
Nine other candidates		7,147	0.28
Total		2,549,466	100.00
Source: African Elections Database

== Aftermath ==
A crisis erupted after the elections in 18 out of the 23 LGAs across the state, which led to loss of lives and property, with a death toll of between 401 and 957 people as put together by the judicial commission of inquiry.
