= Kaduna Capital Territory Authority =

Metropolitan authority in Nigeria

Kaduna Capital Territory Authority (KCTA) is one of the three Kaduna Metropolitan Authorities in Kaduna state, Nigeria. The authority oversees 4 out of 23 local governments in Kaduna state, namely; Kaduna North, Kaduna South, Chikun and Igabi local government areas. In 2021, the law that established Kaduna Capital Territory Authority was passed. Kaduna Capital Territory Authority was formerly called Kaduna Local Government Authority after Kaduna city was made the capital of the state in 1937. The local government authority was a creation of the British colonial rule to oversee taxation, the production of food crops and export to Britain. The authority was first headed by District Head, Aminu Sambo in 1937. The current administrator of Kaduna Capital Territory Authority is Samuel Aruwan.

Administrators	Years in Service
R.G. Adams	1956 - 1960
Umaru Audi	1960 - 1961
Abubakar Kigo	1961 - 1963
Abubakar Umar	1963 - 1965
Abubakar Garba JA AbdulKadir	1965 - 1966
Abba Dabo Sambo	1966 - 1968
Sa'idu Barda	1968 - 1969
Shehu Sulaiman	1969 - 1970
Magaji Muhammad	1970 - 1975
Balarabe Mahmud	1975 - 1976
Ahmadu Bakori	1976 - 1979
Muhammad Hafiz Bayero	2021 - 2023
Samuel Aruwan	2023 - date
