= Sabon Layi attack =

2023 bandit attack in Nigeria

- Part of Nigerian bandit conflict
- Location: Sabon Layi, Birnin Gwari LGA, Kaduna State, Nigeria
- Date: 12 April 2023; 8:00am
- Deaths: 9
- Victim: 60+ villagers displaced
- Perpetrator: Unknown bandits

On 12 April 2023, unknown bandits attacked the village of Sabon Layi, Birnin Gwari LGA, Kaduna State, Nigeria, killing nine civilians. The perpetrators were found by Nigerian forces later that day and killed.

== Background ==
Birnin Gwari LGA of Kaduna State has been a hotspot of banditry, most often from Ansaru, since the late 2010s. On 1 April 2023, Nigerian officials reported that eleven militants were killed during an offensive against militant camps around several towns, including Sabon Layi. The clearance was part of the Nigerian army's Operation Whirl Punch against bandits in the area.

== Attack ==
The attack began around 8am on 12 April, when bandits stormed the village of Sabon Layi. Nigerian officials first received notification of the attack at 9:44am. The assailants shot sporadically for an hour, stealing livestock and looting from homes before they fled. The bodies of five victims were discovered in the village, and four others were found in the bush. Many residents escaped into the bush, with the IOM saying that around 60 residents were displaced in the attacks.

Nigerian aerial forces from Operation Whirl Punch entered Sabon Layi and pursued the attackers later that day. The bandits were discovered four kilometers north of Sabon Layi, where they were airstriked and an unknown number were killed and injured. Blurred photos released by Samuel Aruwan showed the bodies of at least four militants.
