= Mohammad Shehu =

Nigerian politician

Mohammad N. Shehu

Member of the House of Representatives
- In office 2003–2007
- Constituency: Birnin Gwari/Giwa Federal Constituency

Personal details
- Born: December 1971 (age 54) Kaduna State, Nigeria
- Party: Peoples Democratic Party
- Occupation: Politician

Mohammad N. Shehu is a Nigerian politician born in December 1971 in Kaduna State. He represented the Birnin-Gwari/Giwa Federal Constituency in the 5th National Assembly from 2003 to 2007 as a member of the Peoples Democratic Party (PDP). He earned a B.Sc. degree in Quantity Surveying from Ahmadu Bello University, Zaria.
