= Edward Percy Masha =

Nigerian politician

Commissioner for Water Resources in Kaduna State

Personal details
- Born: Kaduna State, Nigeria
- Party: Peoples Democratic Party (PDP)
- Occupation: Politician

Edward Percy Masha is a Nigerian politician who served as the Commissioner for Water Resources in Kaduna State during the administration of Ahmed Mohammed Makarfi. In September 2024, he was elected as the new Chairman of the Peoples Democratic Party (PDP) in Kaduna State.
