= Isa Ashiru Kudan =

Nigerian politician

Member of the House of Representatives of Nigeria
- In office 2007–2015
- Preceded by: Abdullahi Mohammed
- Succeeded by: Muhammad Usman

Member of Kaduna State House of Assembly
- In office 1999–2007
- Succeeded by: Hon. Danlami Dan-Inna

Personal details
- Born: 23 October 1962 (age 64) Kudan, Kaduna State - Nigeria
- Party: People Democratic Party (2018–present)
- Other political affiliations: All Progressives Congress (2014 - 2018)
- Education: Kufena College Wusasa
- Alma mater: Katsina Polytechnic; Kaduna State Polytechnic; Bayero University
- Website: isaashiru.com
- Nickname: Mai Solar

Isa Ashiru Kudan (born 23 October 1962) is a Nigerian politician from Kudan, Nigeria. He is a business man and holds the traditional title of Sarkin Bai of Zazzau Emirate. He is the governorship candidate of Peoples Democratic Party for 2023 in Kaduna State, Nigeria. He was previously the House of Representatives of Nigeria representing Kudan/Makarfi Federal Constituency from 2007 to 2015, and Member representing Kudan Constituency at Kaduna State House of Assembly.

== Family and education ==
Ashiru was born on 23 October 1962 in Kudan LGA of Kaduna State. He is married to one wife and blessed with 7 children. He lost his father at a very young age.

Ashiru attended LEA primary school, Kudan from 1968 to 1974. Between 1975 and 1980, Ashiru attended Secondary School at Kufena College Wusasa, Zaria. He proceeded to earn his National Diploma in Business Administration from 1982 to 1985 at the Katsina Polytechnic.

From 1987 to 1989, he attended Kaduna State Polytechnic and completed his HND. In 1990, he served the National Youth Service Corps (BO/KD/89/42117) in Borno State.

In 1999, he acquired a post Graduate Diploma in Marketing Management. He earned a master's degree in Public policy and Administration from the year 2000–2001 at Bayero university Kano (BUK).

== Career ==
After his SSCE, Ashiru worked with Kaduna State Ministry of Finance from 1980 to 1982. He later moved to Kaduna State Board of Internal Revenue from 1985 to 1992, before working with Kaduna State Ministry of Commerce, Industry, and Tourism from 1992 to 1997.

== Political career ==
In 1996, following his resignation, he contested for chairmanship under the platform of zero party and lost. He re-contested in 1997 under the platform of SDP (social Democratic party) and also lost. In 1998, he contested for the position of Member Kaduna State House of Assembly under the platform of DPN and lost.

In 1999, Ashiru was elected as Member of the Kaduna State House of Assembly representing Kudan Constituency under the platform of Peoples Democratic Party (Nigeria). In 2003, he was re-elected for a second term.

In 2007, he was elected Member representing Kudan/Makarfi Constituency at the Federal House of Representatives of Nigeria. In 2011, he was re-elected to serve for a second term. At the House of Representatives of Nigeria, Ashiru was the Chairman House Committee on Appropriations.

In 2014, Ashiru decamped to All Progressives Congress and contested for the gubernatorial primaries and lost to Nasir el-Rufai after a hard-fought election. In 2018, Ashiru returned to the opposition Peoples Democratic Party (Nigeria) where he contested and won the gubernatorial primaries.

== Governorship election ==
Ashiru was the governorship candidate of the Peoples Democratic Party (Nigeria) in 2019 Kaduna State gubernatorial election. Sunday Marshall Katung was his running mate. Nasir el-Rufai polled 1,045,427 votes (55.32%) to beat Ashiru who got 814,168 votes (43.08%), although the PDP candidate alleged that the election was characterized by controversies and irregularities. The election petition tribunal declined Ashiru's request for vote recount, thereby upholding El-rufai's victory at the polls.

=== PDP Candidate in 2023 ===
Ashiru won the ticket of Peoples Democratic Party (Nigeria) for 2023 governorship election in Kaduna State, with former commissioner of finance, John Markus Ayuba as running mate. He will challenge APC's candidate, Senator Uba Sani.

ADC Candidate in 2027

A two-time former governorship candidate of the Peoples Democratic Party (PDP) in Kaduna State, Isa Ashiru, has emerged as the governorship candidate of the African Democratic Congress (ADC) in the state ahead of the 2027 general election.

== Certificate controversy ==
Prof. Muhammad Sani Bello, an APC chieftain had alleged that "Isah Ashiru does not possess the required or competency to become the governor of Kaduna State because he did not possess the requisite leaving school certificate." But speaking with Premium Times, Ashiru denied submitting fake credentials to INEC. He went on to sue Bello for defamation of character. In a separate case, a member of the PDP Abdullahi Isa filed a suit at the High Court in Zaria, alleging that Ashiru was not qualified to contest. However, the Court ruled in favour of Ashiru that he is qualified to contest the 2023 governorship election because he has the minimum educational qualification.
