= Umar Sani =

Media advisor

- Born: Umar Sani; January 25, 1963 (age 63); Kaduna, Kaduna State, Nigeria
- Occupations: Media & Public Affairs
- Office: Senior Special Adviser, Media & Publicity to the Nigerian Vice President, Namadi Sambo
- Political party: PDP
- Spouse: Hajiya Sahura Umar Tijjani (died 2013)
- Children: 4

Umar Sani (born January 25, 1963) is Senior Special Adviser on Media and Publicity to Vice President Namadi Sambo of Nigeria. He has been Sambo's aide since 2007 when the latter just won the gubernatorial elections in Kaduna. He was also part of the PDP campaign council in 2019 representing as a spokesman, he is also a long serving member of the PDP.

== Career ==
Umar Sani began his career as a teacher when the teaching profession was exclusively preserved for the best from the academics. After graduating from the Kagoro Teachers College in the early 1980s, in Kaduna state he took up appointment with the old Kaduna Local Education Department as a classroom teacher.

Later he resigned his appointment and enrolled at the famous Kaduna Polytechnic, in Kaduna where he achievedhis National Diploma in Marketing. After successfully completing the course, he was employed by the newly created National Teachers Institute as a store officer. Again his thirst for education drove him out of his well-paid job in pursuit of further studies after only two years of his appointment. He thereafter resigned to further his studies. In 1992, he obtained his Higher National Diploma in Marketing. As tradition demands, he was posted to the Ministry of Finance and Economic Planning Bauchi State and Later the United Bank for Africa (UBA), Bauchi Branch for his one-year mandatory service for graduates.

On the completion of his youth service in 1993, he secured appointment with the Kaduna State Kada Payless Stores as HOD of Procurement where he served until 1997 at which time he also resigned to further his studies. He received his post-graduate diploma in marketing a year later.

With the lift of the ban on political activities by the military regime of the late General Sani Abacha, he joined active politics pitching his tent with the Democratic Party of Nigeria (DPN) as one of its founding members of the state chapter which appointed him its administrative secretary.

In 1998, with the demise of the late general, and the formation of new political parties and structures, Umar Sani joined the newly formed People’s Democratic Party (PDP) and was among the first set of members involved in its nurturing. He was elected the party’s first administrative secretary in Kaduna State, a post he held until his appointment as the Senior Special Assistant on Political Matters to the state governor, a post he held from 2003-2006.

In 2007, when Arc Mohammed Namadi Sambo was elected governor of the State, he appointed him Director/General Media and Public Affairs in the state and later elevated him to the position of special adviser to the governor on the same portfolio.

With the demise of the president late Umaru Musa Yar’adua in 2009 and the subsequent appointment of Sambo as the Vice President of the Federal Republic of Nigeria, he appointed him his Senior Special Adviser on Media and Publicity, a position he held till 2015 .

== Awards and achievements ==
Umar Sani received numerous awards in recognition of his hard work and perseverance from high school. They include awards such as Special Contribution to Old Boys of Kagoro Teachers College Award, Special Recognition Award by Media Monitors, an Award of Excellence in recognition of Educational Development in Kaduna North Local Government and another Award of Excellence by the State PTA chapter and NUT Kaduna North Local Government for contribution towards the improvement of education.

In recent times, he has also been given The Most Outstanding Media Manager Award by Nigerian Tribune, The Best Media Person award by Power Steering Magazine and The Best Media Manager Award in 2014 by Citypeople magazine amongst others

== Personal life ==
He was widowed in 2013 when his wife, Hajiya Sahura Umar died in a Cairo hospital in June 2013. They have four children together - three boys and a girl.
