= Samaru =

Town in Kaduna State, Nigeria

SamaruProunciation is a town in Zaria and ward in Sabon Gari Local Government of Kaduna state, Nigeria. The town is a semi-urban area in which the Ahmadu Bello University main campus is located. Samaru is one of the most popular towns in Zaria with different ethnic groups living together in peace and harmony. Samaru is home for all tribe.

== Geography ==
Samaru is located on latitude 110' 25'N and Longitude 40' 26'E with two basic seasons, which are dry season and the rainy season. The seasons of Samaru enable farmers to produce good farm products at the end of every season.

== History ==
The name 'Samaru' originates from the Savannah Agricultural Mechanisation and Research Unit (SAMARU), it was a prominent agricultural program in Zaria, Northern Nigeria (1922 - 1945), the program specialized in groundnut farming, which was a crucial source of revenue for the region. Over time, the area in Zaria where the agricultural farms were situated came to be known as 'SAMARU'. Samaru came into full existence when the Institute for Agriculture Research and Training Center was established in 1924.

== Educational institutions ==
- Ahmadu Bello University, Samaru.
- Institute of Agricultural Research, Samaru.

=== Secondary Schools ===
- Government Secondary School Samaru - zaria.
- Model Learning Secondary School Samaru-Zaria
