= Namadi Sambo =

Vice President of Nigeria from 2010 to 2015

His Excellency Namadi Sambo GCON
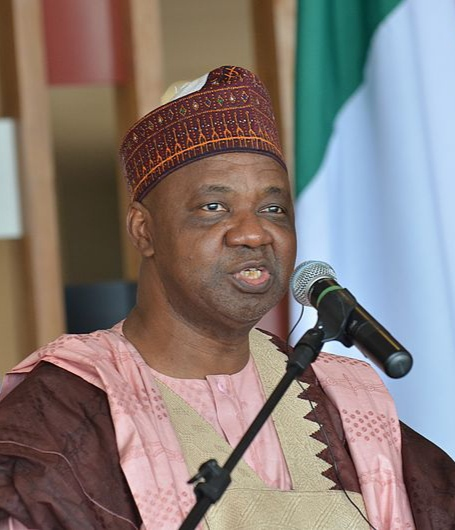

13th Vice President of Nigeria
- In office 19 May 2010 – 29 May 2015
- President: Goodluck Jonathan
- Preceded by: Goodluck Jonathan
- Succeeded by: Yemi Osinbajo

Governor of Kaduna State
- In office 29 May 2007 – 19 May 2010
- Deputy: Patrick Yakowa
- Preceded by: Ahmed Makarfi
- Succeeded by: Patrick Yakowa

Personal details
- Born: Mohammed Namadi Sambo; 2 August 1954 (age 72) Zaria, Northern Region, British Nigeria (now in Kaduna State, Nigeria)
- Party: Peoples Democratic Party
- Spouse: Amina Sambo
- Education: Ahmadu Bello University (B.Sc and M.Sc)
- Occupation: Politician; architect

Mohammed Namadi Sambo GCON (born 2 August 1954) is a Nigerian politician who served as the vice president of Nigeria from 19 May 2010 to 29 May 2015. He previously served as governor of Kaduna State from 2007 to 2010.

== Early life ==
Mohammed Namadi Sambo was born on 2 August 1954 in Zaria, then Northern Region, he attended Baptist Primary School in Kakuri, Kaduna, before attending Kobi Primary School in Bauchi and Towns School No. 1 in Zaria. From 1967 until 1971, he attended Government Secondary School (now Alhuda-Huda College), in Zaria.

== Education ==
Sambo attended the School of Basic Studies at Ahmadu Bello University in Zaria in 1972, after which he joined its Department of Architecture, graduating in 1976 with a bachelors degree with honours (BSc (Hons)). He also holds a master's degree in architecture.

== Early career ==
Sambo served with the Oyo State Ministry of Works and Housing for the National Youth Service Corps up to August 1979. He then went into private practice as an architect. In 1988, he was appointed Commissioner for Works, Transport and Housing in Kaduna. In 1990, Sambo left the service of the Kaduna State Government and went back to private practice.

== Governor of Kaduna State (2007–2010) ==
In May 2007, Sambo assumed office as Governor of Kaduna State after winning the 2007 Kaduna State gubernatorial election held on 14 April. His term ended on 19 May 2010, when he was sworn in as vice president of Nigeria. Sambo had an 11-point agenda as governor that was to focus on empowering the youth and women of the community and to address security of the state. While still serving as governor, he was picked by then president of Nigeria, Goodluck Jonathan, to become the vice president.

== Vice President of Nigeria (2010–2015) ==
Seal of the vice president

Following the death of President Umaru Yar'Adua, Goodluck Jonathan was sworn in as the president and nominated Sambo as vice president. His official correspondence conveying the nomination of Sambo for the vice-presidential position was received by the National Assembly on 15 May 2010. On 18 May 2010, the National Assembly approved the nomination. On 19 May 2010, Namadi Sambo was formally sworn in as the vice president of Nigeria, serving in office until 29 May 2015 with his senior special adviser Umar Sani.

== See also ==
- List of governors of Kaduna State
- Vice President of Nigeria

Party political offices
Preceded by Ahmed Makarfi	PDP nominee for Governor of Kaduna State; 2007	Succeeded by Patrick Ibrahim Yakowa
Preceded by Goodluck Jonathan	PDP nominee for Vice President of Nigeria; 2011, 2015	Succeeded by Peter Obi
Political offices
Preceded by Ahmed Makarfi	Governor of Kaduna State; 2007–2010	Succeeded by Patrick Ibrahim Yakowa
Preceded by Goodluck Jonathan	Vice President of Nigeria; 2010–2015	Succeeded by Yemi Osinbajo
