= Yusuf Datti Baba-Ahmed =

Nigerian politician (born 1969)

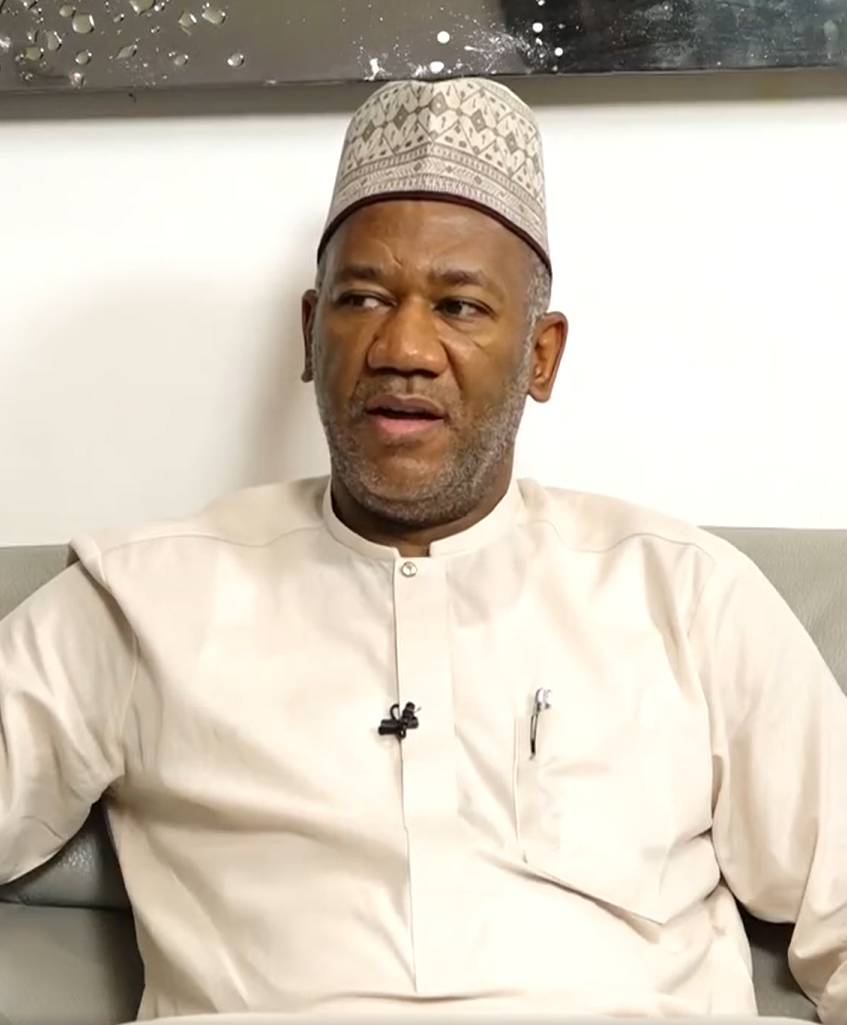
- Baba-Ahmed in 2022

Senator for Kaduna North
- In office 6 June 2011 – 14 November 2011
- Preceded by: Ahmed Makarfi
- Succeeded by: Ahmed Makarfi

Member of the House of Representatives of Nigeria from Kaduna
- In office 3 June 2003 – 5 June 2007
- Constituency: Zaria

Personal details
- Born: 7 July 1969 (age 57) Zaria, Nigeria
- Party: PRP (2026–present)
- Other political affiliations: All Nigeria Peoples Party (2002–2008); Congress for Progressive Change (2010–2012); Peoples Democratic Party (2012–2022); Labour Party (2022– 2026)
- Education: University of Maiduguri (BSc, MSc); University of Wales (MBA); University of Westminster (PhD); London School of Economics (Certificate in Practical Economics); Harvard Kennedy School (National and International Security); London Business School (Senior Executive Programme); Harvard Business School (Owner/President Management Programme)
- Occupation: Politician; Economist; Educationist; Entrepreneur

Yusuf Datti Baba-Ahmed (born 7 July 1969) is a Nigerian politician, economist, and educational investor. He is the founder of Baze University and a former senator representing the Kaduna North Senatorial District in 2011. He also represented Zaria in the House of Representatives from 2003 to 2007. A member of the Peoples Redemption Party, Baba-Ahmed was the vice-presidential candidate in the 2023 Nigerian presidential election, alongside Peter Obi.

== Early life and heritage ==
Yusuf Datti Baba-Ahmed stems from an influential familial and tribal lineage. His ancestors hail from the Hassaniya tribe in Mauritania and the Al Faqqah Clan of Chinghetti, known for their substantial scholarly contributions throughout North Africa. His family moved to Zaria in 1925, where his father, a respected Islamic cleric, served as a Native Authority Court judge and the Imam of Barewa College. His father's literary works in Islamic theology and Hausa literature significantly impacted future Nigerian leaders.

== Education ==
Baba-Ahmed pursued a robust educational background. He completed his GCE ‘O’ Levels at the Airforce Military School, Jos, in 1986. He obtained a BSc in economics in 1992 and an MSc in economics in 1995 from the University of Maiduguri. Furthering his education, he earned an MBA from the University of Wales in 1996, a Certificate in Practical Economics from the London School of Economics in 1998, and a PhD in economics from the University of Westminster in 2006. His executive education includes programs at London Business School and Harvard Kennedy School.

== Career ==
=== Professional ===
Baba-Ahmed's career commenced with a public service placement at the University of Agriculture, Abeokuta, during his National Youth Service Corps (NYSC) in 1992. He subsequently held various roles including Project Coordinator at Baze Research and Data Services Ltd., Officer II at the Nigeria Security Printing and Minting Company, and Banking Officer at First Bank of Nigeria in London. He served as Project Manager for Bilfinger + Berger UK Ltd. and eventually became managing director at Baze Research and Data Services Ltd.

=== Political ===
His political journey began with his election to the House of Representatives in 2003, where he advocated for anti-corruption measures and opposed constitutional amendments for a third presidential term. In 2011, he was elected to the Senate, focusing on transparency and economic reforms; however, his tenure was cut short by a court ruling. Baba-Ahmed was a presidential aspirant in 2018 and competed as a vice-presidential candidate in the elections held in February 2023, prioritizing progressive leadership with Peter Obi.

=== Entrepreneurship ===
Baba-Ahmed founded educational institutions including Baze University in Abuja and Baba-Ahmed University in Kano, aiming to elevate educational standards. He initiated Baze University Hospital to provide top-tier healthcare services and established Baze Construction Ltd. to bolster infrastructural endeavors.

== Personal life ==
Baba-Ahmed is married to Aisha, daughter of late senator Bello Maitama, and they have six children. He is renowned for his integrity, discipline, and anti-corruption stance.

== Contributions and legacy ==
Baba-Ahmed is known for his dedication to advancing educational opportunities and infrastructure in Nigeria. He has consistently advocated for economic development, political stability, and social inclusion. His tenacity is exemplified by his regular commutes between Nigeria and the UK during his PhD studies.

Party political offices
Preceded by Akpan Tom Ezekiel	LP nominee for Vice President of Nigeria; 2023	Most recent
