= Soba, Nigeria =

Soba
- Town and LGA
- Interactive map of Soba
- Country: Nigeria
- State: Kaduna State
- Headquarter: Maigana

Government
  - Type: Local
  - Executive Chairman: Mohammed Usman

Area
  - Total: 5 km^{2} (1.9 sq mi)

Population (2006)
  - Total: 293,270
  - Density: 59,000/km^{2} (150,000/sq mi)
- Time zone: UTC+1 (WAT)
- Postal code: 810

Soba is a Local Government Area in Kaduna State, Nigeria. Its headquarters is situated in the Maigana, which is the capital of the Local Government.

It has an area of 5 km^{2} and a population of 293,270 at the 2006 census. Its postal code is 801122. The Local Government Council is chaired by Mohammed Usman.

The postal code of the area is 810. Soba local Government has 16 districts. soba Local Government has boundary with other local government like Makarfi, sabon Gari local Government in Kaduna state.

== Climatic condition ==
With an average annual temperature of 29 °C (84 °F) and 136.06 days with rain, Soba, a district in Nigeria, has a tropical wet and dry climate that is 0.12% colder than the national average. Soba, it is hot all year round, with a stifling and cloudy wet season and a partially cloudy dry season. It seldom drops below 9 °C (48 °F) or rises over 39 °C (102 °F) throughout the year, usually fluctuating between 12 °C (54 °F) and 36 °C (96 °F).

=== Average Temperature ===
With an average daily high temperature of 34 °C (93 °F), the hot season spans 1.9 months, from March 3 to April 29. With average high temperatures of 35 °C (95 °F) and low temperatures of 21 °C (70 °F), April is the hottest month of the year in Soba. With an average daily maximum temperature below 29 °C (84 °F), the cool season spans 3.0 months, from July 3 to October 2. With an average low of 13 °C (55 °F) and high of 29 °C (84 °F), December is the coldest month of the year in Soba.

== Districts under Soba Local Government ==
The following are Districts of Soba Local Government.

- Soba Town
- Turawa
- Richifa
- Rahama
- Dan wata
- Gimba
- Kinkiba
- Garun Gwanki
- Kwassallo
- Maigana
- Gamagira
- Kaware
- Matari
- Awai
- Yakasai
- Tudun Saibu
- Dinya

== Economic activities of Soba ==
Soba has several markets for economic Activities which attract buyers and sellers from different parts of Kaduna state. Also farming is their major activities with crops like rice, wheats and beans. other occupations adopted by the people of Soba LGA include: animal rearing, hunting and craft making.

== Agriculture and forestry activities ==
Soba Land has conservation and land-management practices that support the cultivation of calcium-rich annual grasses for livestock production.
