= Samuel Aruwan =

Nigerian journalist

- Born: Tudun Wada, Kaduna
- Education: Ahmadu Bello University, Kaduna Polytechnic, Drew University
- Occupation: Journalism

Samuel Aruwan is a Nigerian journalist, and pioneer Commissioner for Kaduna State Ministry of Internal Security and Home Affairs.

== Early life and education ==
Samuel Aruwan hails from Tudun Wada, in the Tudun Wada District of Kaduna South Local Government Area, Kaduna State, Nigeria.

Aruwan is a graduate of Mass Communication. He holds two Master's degrees from Ahmadu Bello University, Zaria—one in Strategic Communication and another in Information Management. Currently, he is a postgraduate student in the same university's Department of Mass Communication, focusing on conflict-sensitive reporting and governance, with a particular emphasis on Northern Nigeria. In December 2002, he completed Basic and Second Level training on Alternatives to Violence Project Course (AVP) sponsored by International Committee of the Red Cross (ICRC) Geneva and Nigerian Red Cross Society. He also completed an in-depth course in Participatory Video by Insight International in collaboration with the Development Research Centre on Citizenship, Participation and Accountability, Institute of Development Studies, Sussex in October 2006. In 2012, he attended the African Investigative Journalism training at the University of the Witwatersrand, South Africa. He was one of the Nigerian journalists trained on countering religious extremism at the Tony Blair Institute for Global Change, London in 2014 and at Drew University’s Institute on Religion and Conflict Transformation, New Jersey in 2016. In April 2021, he attended the Cranfield University’s Continuing Professional Development course on Protecting Critical National Infrastructure (CNI). He also obtained a certificate in counter-terrorism and intelligence at the same Cranfield University in December 2022 with distinction. He further holds a certification in Disarmament, Demobilization, and Reintegration from the Martin Luther Agwai International Leadership and Peacekeeping Centre (MLAIPKC) in Jaji, Nigeria, and is an alumnus of the U.S. Department of State's International Visitor Leadership Program (IVLP) on 'Transparency and Accountability in Government'.

== Journalism and Public Service ==
His journalism career began as an intern at the New Nigerian Newspapers and Daily Independent Newspapers, after which he joined Leadership Newspapers Group where he progressed from reporter to bureau chief. In October 2011 he joined Blueprint Newspapers Limited as chief of the Kaduna bureau. In December 2014 he took a leave of absence to serve as spokesperson to Malam Nasir Ahmad el-Rufai, a governorship candidate in Kaduna State in the 2015 general elections.

In May 2015, Government of Kaduna State appointed him as its official spokesperson of the Governor and Government of Kaduna State. In May 2017, he was promoted to senior special assistant for media and publicity.

Aruwan played a key role in the 2015, 2019, and 2023 election campaigns and the successes in both the presidential and governorship elections through strategic communication and political insights.

For nearly a decade, he served as a member of the Kaduna State Security Council—the body composed of the heads of all military, police, and Department of State Services, as well as paramilitary agencies operating in the state — and cultivated extensive connections with human intelligence sources across Kaduna State and beyond.

On 12 July 2019, he took oath of office as a Commissioner and member of the Kaduna State Executive Council. His key role is coordinating the internal security functions, and leading government policies on internal security management of Kaduna state. In January 2021, Aruwan bagged the award of Crisis Manager of the Year at the annual Security and Emergency Management Awards (SAEMA) 2020.

Aruwan was appointed as the 14th Administrator/Commissioner of Kaduna Capital Territory Authority by Governor Uba Sani on June 20, 2023. This appointment has made him a member of the Kaduna State Executive Council. As one of Nigeria's experts on banditry attacks in Northern Nigeria, he has been well-reported in the media. He is skilled and versed in crisis management and strategic communication, he has played a critical role in peace, security, and counter-terrorism initiatives in Kaduna State and across Northern Nigeria.
