= List of governors of Kaduna State =

This is a list of administrators and governors of Kaduna State. Kaduna State was created on 27 May 1967 as North Central State and on 17 Mar 1976 was renamed Kaduna State.

North Central Governor	Title	Took office	Left office	Party	Notes
Abba Kyari	Governor	28 May 1967	Jul 1975	Military	
Usman Jibrin	Governor	July 1975	1977	Military	
Kaduna Governor					
Muktar Muhammed	Governor	1977	July 1978	Military	
Ibrahim Mahmud Alfa	Governor	July 1978	October 1979	Military	
Abdulkadir Balarabe Musa	Governor	October 1979	23 June 1981	PRP	
Abba Musa Rimi	Governor	6 July 1981	October 1983	PRP	Acting to Oct 1981
Lawal Kaita	Governor	October 1983	December 1983	NPN	
Usman Mu'azu	Governor	January 1984	August 1985	Military	
Dangiwa Umar	Governor	August 1985	June 1988	Military	
Abdullahi Sarki Mukhtar	Governor	July 1988	August 1990	Military	
Abubakar Tanko Ayuba	Governor	August 1990	2 January 1992	Military	
Mohammed Dabo Lere	Governor	2 January 1992	November 1993	NRC	
Lawal Jafaru Isa	Administrator	9 December 1993	22 August 1996	Military	
Hammed Ali	Administrator	22 August 1996	August 1998	Military	
Umar Farouk Ahmed	Administrator	August 1998	29 May 1999	Military	
Ahmed Makarfi	Governor	29 May 1999	29 May 2007	PDP	
Mohammed Namadi Sambo	Governor	29 May 2007	19 May 2010	PDP	left to become VP of the Federal Republic of Nigeria
Patrick Ibrahim Yakowa	Governor	20 May 2010	15 December 2012	PDP	died in a helicopter crash
Mukhtar Ramalan Yero	Governor	15 December 2012	29 May 2015	PDP	
Nasiru Ahmed El-Rufai	Governor	29 May 2015	29 May 2023	APC	
Uba Sani	Governor	29 May 2023	Incumbent	APC	

== See also ==
- States of Nigeria
- List of state governors of Nigeria
