= Patrick Yakowa =

Nigerian politician (1948–2012)

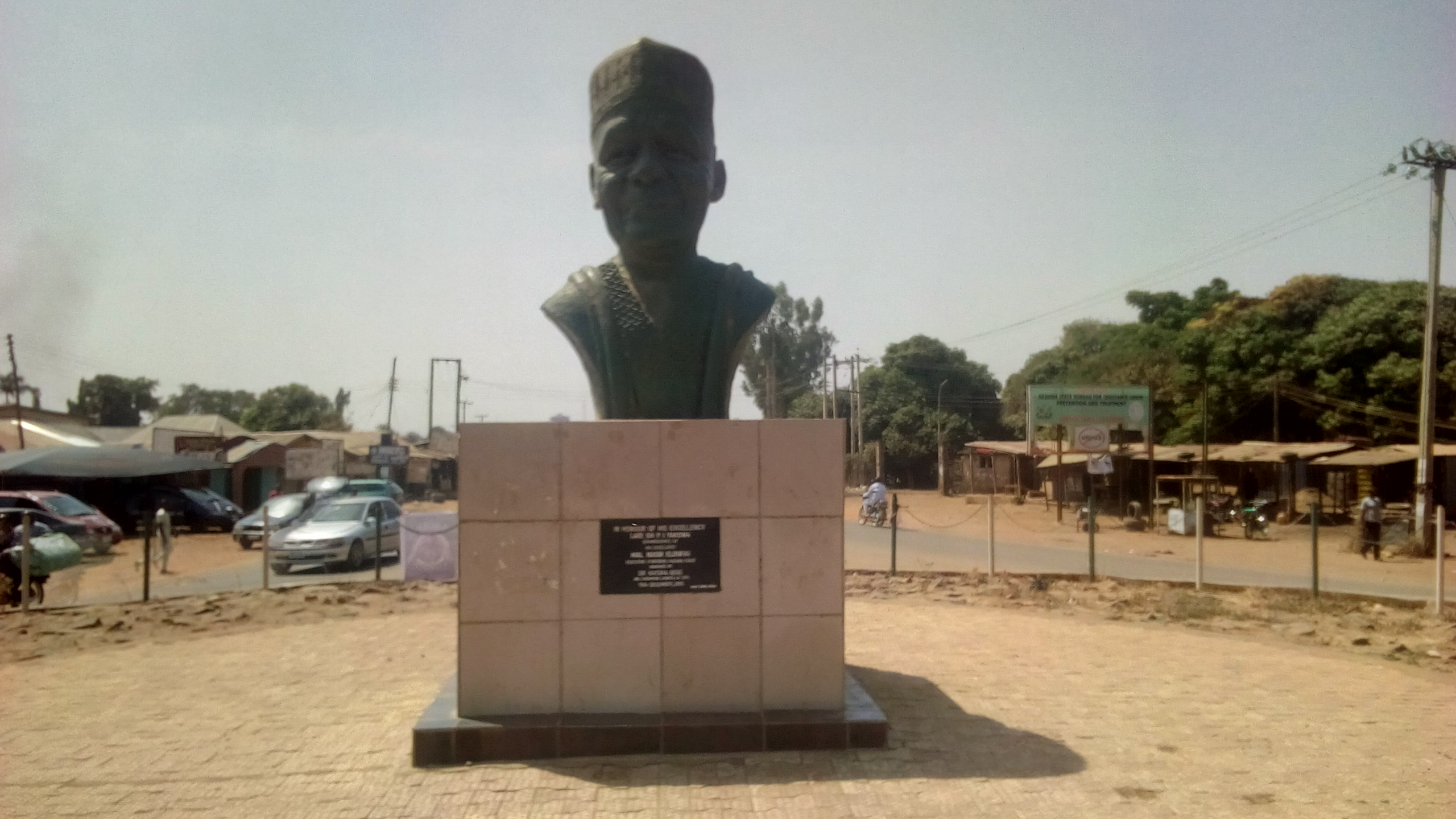

Governor of Kaduna State
- In office 20 May 2010 – 15 December 2012
- Deputy: Mukhtar Yero
- Preceded by: Namadi Sambo
- Succeeded by: Mukhtar Yero

Deputy Governor of Kaduna State
- In office 21 July 2005 – 20 May 2010
- Governor: Ahmed Makarfi (2005–2007); Namadi Sambo (2007–2010)
- Preceded by: Stephen Shekari
- Succeeded by: Mukhtar Yero

Personal details
- Born: Patrick Ibrahim Yakowa; 1 December 1948 Fadan Kagoma, Jema'a, Northern Region, British Nigeria (now in Kaduna State, Nigeria)
- Died: 15 December 2012 (aged 64) Okoroba forest, Nembe, Bayelsa State, Nigeria
- Resting place: Fadan Kagoma, Jema'a, Kaduna State, Nigeria
- Party: Peoples Democratic Party
- Spouse: Amina Yakowa
- Children: 4
- Education: Ahmadu Bello University
- Occupation: Politician

Patrick Ibrahim Yakowa (1 December 1948 – 15 December 2012) was a Nigerian politician who served as Governor of Kaduna State from 2010 to 2012. He was appointed deputy governor of Kaduna State in July 2005, following the death of Stephen Shekari and was elected in 2007. He was sworn in as governor on 20 May 2010, replacing governor Namadi Sambo who had been sworn in as vice president the day before. Yakowa successfully ran for election as Kaduna Governor in the 26 April 2011 polls.

== Background ==
Yakowa was born on 1 December 1948 in Fadan Kagoma, Jema'a, then Northern Region. He attended St. Mary’s Secondary School, Fadan Kaje and St. John College, Kaduna, and then was admitted to Ahmadu Bello University, Zaria.

He graduated with a B.Sc (Social Sciences) in June 1972.

== Civil service career ==
Yakowa joined the civil service of North Central State, serving as division officer, secretary in the Military Governor’s Office, and local government sole administrator.

He rose to permanent secretary in the Kaduna State civil service, heading the Ministries of Health, Works and Transport.

In 1990, Yakowa transferred to the federal civil service until the administration of General Sani Abacha appointed him commissioner in Kaduna State from 1994 to 1997.

Returning to the federal civil service after this posting, he was director joint services at the Ministry of Defense from February 1997 to August 1998, and then a Director at the Ministry of Solid Minerals Development until 14 June 1999, when he was appointed permanent secretary and retired.

== Political career ==
Yakowa worked for the Ahmed Makarfi campaign organization in 2003, helping Governor Makarfi get re-elected.

He was also chairman of the Rivers State Screening Committee for the Peoples Democratic Party (PDP) in 2003. Yakowa was appointed Secretary to the Government of Kaduna State in September 2003. He was appointed Deputy Governor of Kaduna State in July 2005, replacing Stephen Shekari, who had died on July 10.

In December 2006, he was a contender to be PDP candidate for governor of Kaduna State, but lost out to Namadi Sambo. Yakowa ran as the running mate to Namadi Sambo, who was elected as Governor. In December 2009, Yakowa denied claims that state administration was marginalizing Southern Kaduna. He said statements to that effect were "bizarre and mischievous" and said the government was making special efforts to provide social amenities in the area.

A southerner himself, he called on the people of the region to stop agitating for a southern governor candidate in the 2011 elections, but to help governor Namadi Sambo gain a second term, and wait for 2015 to get a southern governor.

In May 2010, there were rumors that President Goodluck Jonathan would nominate Kaduna State governor Namadi Sambo as his vice president, which would cause Yakowa to become governor. If so, he would be the first person from Southern Kaduna and first Christian to become governor in the state, an innovation to which some Northern leaders objected.

The rumors proved true and on 20 May 2010, the day after Sambo had become vice-president, Yakowa was sworn in as Kaduna governor. To reassure people in the ethnically and religiously mixed state, he said: "I am governor for all, irrespective of religious or tribal affiliation".

Yakowa successfully ran for election as Kaduna Governor in the 26 April 2011 polls on the Peoples Democratic Party (PDP) platform. In a close race, he polled 1,334,319 votes to clinch victory with a difference of 200,755 votes over the Congress for Progressive Change (CPC) candidate, Haruna Sae'ed, who came second with 1,133,564 votes.

== Death ==
On 15 December 2012, Yakowa died in a helicopter crash along with the former National Security Adviser General Owoye Andrew Azazi (rtd) while flying from Bayelsa State to Port Harcourt. They were returning from the funeral of Oronto Douglas' father in Bayelsa state.

Alhaji Mukhtar Ramalan Yero, the deputy governor to Yakowa, was sworn-in the following day (Sunday, 16 December 2012) as the state's new governor by the state Chief Judge, Justice Rahila Cudjoe.
