= Mukhtar Yero =

Nigerian politician (born 1968)

Governor of Kaduna State
- In office 16 December 2012 – 29 May 2015
- Deputy: Nuhu Bajoga
- Preceded by: Patrick Yakowa
- Succeeded by: Nasir El-Rufai

Deputy Governor of Kaduna State
- In office May 2010 – 16 December 2012
- Governor: Patrick Yakowa
- Preceded by: Patrick Yakowa
- Succeeded by: Nuhu Bajoga

Kaduna State Commissioner of Finance
- In office June 2007 – May 2010
- Governor: Namadi Sambo
- Succeeded by: John Ayuba

Personal details
- Born: Mukhtar Ramalan Yero; 1 May 1968 (age 58) Zaria, North-Central State (now Kaduna State), Nigeria
- Party: All Progressives Congress
- Children: 6
- Education: Ahmadu Bello University
- Occupation: Politician

Mukhtar Ramalan Yero (born 1 May 1968) is a Nigerian politician who served as the Governor of Kaduna State from 2012 to 2015, following the death of Patrick Yakowa in a helicopter crash. He previously served as Deputy governor from 2010 to 2012 and as Kaduna State Commissioner of Finance from 2007 to May 2010 when Yakowa named him deputy governor after he succeeded Namadi Sambo who became the vice president of Nigeria.

== Background ==
Mukhtar Ramalan Yero was born on 1 May 1968, in unguwan Kaura in Zaria, Kaduna State. Yero had his early education at LEA Primary School, Kaura from 1974 to 1980; Government Secondary School Ikara from 1980 to 1985; Government Secondary School, Zaria from 1985 to 1986 before obtaining a Diploma in Banking from Ahmadu Bello University, Zaria. He also obtained B.Sc Accounting in 1991 before capping it with Masters in Business Administration.

A Certified Public Accountant (CPA), Yero started his career as Assistant accountant during his National Youth Service Corps at Ogun State Purchasing Corporation between 1991 and 1992. After the service he was employed as Higher Executive Officer Bursary Department at Ahmadu Bello University in 1993 before moving to Nigerian Universal Bank Limited as Accountant Supervisor the same year. In 1997, he joined a private firm, Nalado Nigerian Limited as Chief Accountant and rose in ranks to become Director of Finance and Administration in 2007.

== Political career ==
After the election of Namadi Sambo in 2007, he was appointed as the commissioner of Finance from 2007 to May 2010. He was selected by governor Patrick Yakowa to fill the vacant deputy governor seat in 2010. In December 2012, he became the Governor of Kaduna State following the death of Yakowa in a helicopter crash in Bayelsa State.

In April 2015, he unsuccessfully ran for re-election, losing to opposition challenger Nasir el-Rufai of the All Progressive Congress.

== See also ==
- List of governors of Kaduna State
