= Sani Sha'aban =

Nigerian politician

Sani Mohammed Sha'aban (born 4 August 1958) is a Nigerian politician who served as a member of the House of Representatives representing Zaria Federal Constituency from 2003 to 2007.

== Early life and education ==
Sha'aban was born in Zaria, Kaduna State, Nigeria. He attended Nurul-Huda L.E.A Primary School in Tudun Wada, Zaria, where he completed his primary education. He later attended Government Commercial College, Zaria, where he obtained his secondary school certificate.

He studied accounting at Ahmadu Bello University, Zaria. He later continued his studies in the United Kingdom at South-West London College and the London School of Accountancy, where he pursued professional studies in accounting and corporate administration.

== Controversy ==
Sani Shaaban was found guilty of breach of trust by the shari'ah court in Zaria and his asset were confiscated over debt. The property known as No48 Yusuf Road Off Hadijiya Road Bomai, Kano State, Mazari Ltd along the Kano Kaduna express road with certificate of occupancy KD 6246, Zaria, Kaduna State, Tulips by MTD junction GRA Zaria Kaduna State, Land and structure at Circular road, GRA Zaria with C of O no KD11226 and Land and Structure behind Sani Shaaban main resident opposite Therbow Schools, GRA Zaria with C of O no 3964 as collateral for the loan agreement. The loan agreement was signed in 2018 Hon Sani Shaaban and Alhaji Umar Farouq Abdullahi to secure his release from a problem he had in Dubai in the same year which lead to his Imprisonment. The total amount of$1.0 million and N11.2 million was given to Shaaban as a loan without interest. Shaaban had paid $290.,762 out of $1.0 million loan later decline to pay the remaining balance. On 27 July 2012 a judgement was passed against Shenshui Construction Company Ltd owned by Sani Shaaban by Kano State High Court in suit No K/296/2009 in favor of Intercontinental Bank Plc. Kano State Water board Said his company Shenshui Construction Company Limited to import and lay 3750 unit of 1000mm and 400mm ductile iron pipes lead the company securing loan facility from Intercontinental Bank. Similarly another judgement by the Supreme Court of Nigeria on Appeal No CA/K/170/2013 between Asset Management Corporation of Nigeria (AMCON), his company and himself further affirmed the guilty verdict on Shaaban by Hon Justice Uludotun A. Adefope Okojie and two other Justice.

== Career ==
Sha'aban began his career in the late 1970s. He worked as a clerk at Union Bank of Nigeria in 1977. In 1978, he joined the Nigerian Mining Corporation where he worked as a sales accountant.

He later became involved in private business activities and served in leadership roles in several companies in Nigeria.

== Political career ==
Sha'aban was elected to the House of Representatives in 2003 under the All Nigeria Peoples Party (ANPP), representing Zaria Federal Constituency. He served until 2007.
