= Kubau =

- LGA
- Motto(s): Home of Grains, Sugarcane and Rearing
- Interactive map of Kubau
- Country: Nigeria
- State: Kaduna State
- Headquarter: Anchau

Government
  - Chairman: Bashir Zuntu

Area
  - Total: 2,505 km^{2} (967 sq mi)

Population (2006)
  - Total: 282,045
  - Density: 112.6/km^{2} (291.6/sq mi)
- Time zone: UTC+1 (WAT)

Kubau Local Government Area is one of the 23 Local Government Areas in Kaduna State, Nigeria. It has its headquarters in the town of Anchau. The Local Government Council is chaired by Bashir Zuntu. The present chairman is Hon. Bashir Zuntu.

It was created during the military regime of General Sani Abacha, on November 2, 1995, from the present Ikara Local Government Area.

== Geography ==
There are two main seasons in the Kubau LGA: the dry season and the rainy season. The area's average temperature is said to be 33 °C, and the Local Government Area's annual precipitation total is reported to be 1100 mm.

=== Climate ===
In Kubau Local Government Area, The dry season is partly cloudy, the wet season is oppressive and mostly cloudy, and the weather is hot all year round. The average annual temperature fluctuates between 21 °C and 24 °C, seldom falling above 40 °C.

== Subdivisions ==
It has eleven political wards, which includes the following;

1. Anchau Ward
2. Pampegua Ward
3. Zuntu Ward
4. Dutsen-wai Ward
5. Damau Ward
6. Kargi Ward
7. Karreh Ward
8. Mah Ward
9. Kubau Ward
10. Haskiya Ward
11. Zabi Ward

It also has 10 districts, with Anchau and Kubau being the oldest as well as the most influential among them. The postal code of the area is 811.

Kubau local government has ancient villages such as Anchau, Gadas, Kuzuntu, with headquarters in Jenau 10 km from the main Anchau.

== People ==
The major tribes are predominantly Hausa and Fulani. Although there are immigrant tribes like Sayawa, Kurama, etc. But they are very few.

The people of Kubau LG are predominantly Muslim by religion, although there are some Christians in some parts of the local government.

== Government ==
Hamisu Ibrahim Kubau is the current serving member representing Ikara/Kubau Federal Constituency, Kaduna State.

== Economy ==
Kubau local government have the famous Anchau weekly (Tuesday) market for selling of cattle and many other agricultural produce such as maize, guinea corn, soya beans among others. Another main market is located in Pambegua, a junction town for selling of many agricultural commodities on Fridays. Other markets are the Dutsenwai Tomatoes Market, a seasonal market for selling of irrigated agricultural commodities like tomatoes. Kogi Tomatoes market is another seasonal market located on Anchau Dutsenwai road at the village of Kogi in Kuzuntu.

It has a lot of natural resources which include iron ore, tin. It is a major agricultural production area in Kaduna State; its major product is sugarcane.

== Education ==
Kubau local government has many primary and secondary schools in all the 11 wards.

== Area and population ==
It has an area of 2,505 km^{2} and a population of 282,045 as at the 2006 census.
