= Sabon Gari, Nigeria =

Coordinates: 11°07′00″N 07°44′00″E

Sabon Gari, Zaria
- LGA and town
- Sabon Gari LGA
- Interactive map of Sabon Gari, Zaria
- Country: Nigeria
- State: Kaduna State
- City: Zaria

Government
  - Chairman: Alhaji Mohammed Usman

Area
  - Total: 263 km^{2} (102 sq mi)

Population (2006)
  - Total: 393,300
  - Density: 1,500/km^{2} (3,870/sq mi)
- Time zone: UTC+1 (WAT)

Sabon Gari is a local government area in Kaduna State, Nigeria. It is one of the LGAs that make up the city of Zaria as well as being one of the districts of the Zazzau Emirate Council. The towns and villages are Dogarawa, Bomo, Basawa, Zabi, Samaru, Kwari, Barashi, Muchiya and Palladan. The Local Government Council is chaired by Hon. Muhammad Jamilu Abubakar.

== History ==
Sabon Gari local government Zaria, is one of the 774 local government area in Nigeria and also among the 23rd local government area of Kaduna state. It was created on the 27th of August 1991 under the rule of Ibrahim Badamasi Babangida.

== Population ==
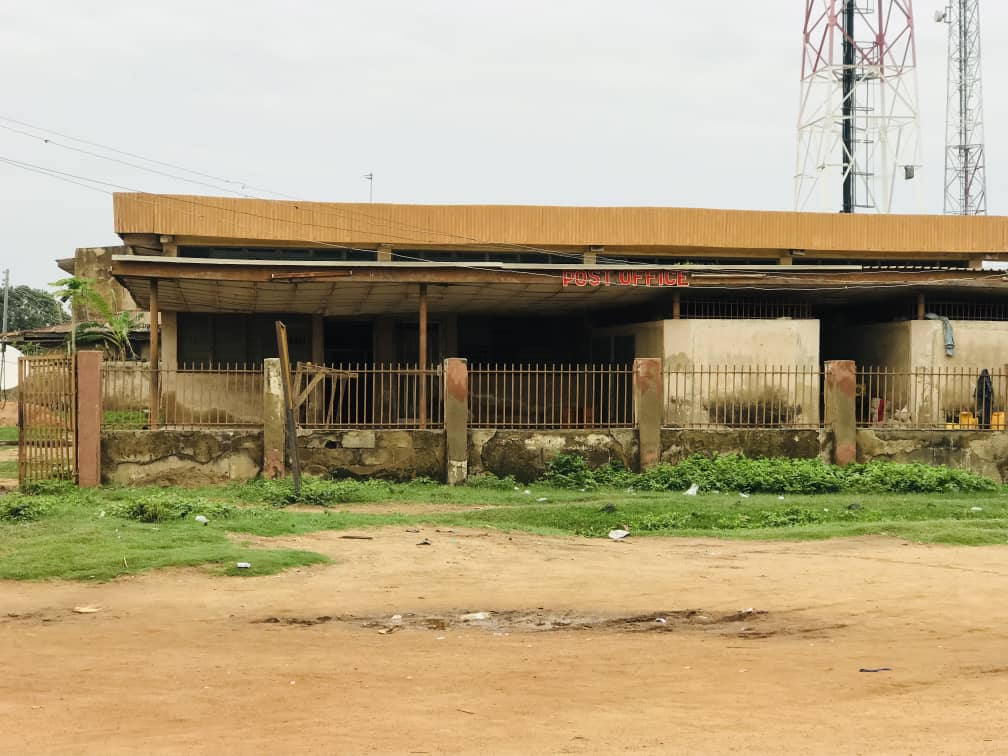
Sabon Gari Post Office

According to the 2016 Nigerian population census, the population of the Sabon Gari LGA is estimated at 393,300.

== Geography and climate ==
The estimated average temperature in the LGA is 32 °C (90 °F). Two major seasons exist: dry and wet. The average wind speed in the LGA is 9 km/h (5.6 mph).

== Local Government Wards ==
There are 11 wards in the Sabon Gari LGA, which are:

- Samaru Ward
- Basawa Ward
- Bomo Ward
- Jama'a Ward
- Chikaji Ward
- Dogarawa Ward
- Hanwa Ward
- Jushin Waje Ward
- Muchia Ward
- Unguwan Gabas Ward
- Zabi Ward

== Economy ==
Trade is a major component of Sabon Gari's economy. The LGA is home to a number of markets, including the large Sabon Gari and Samaru markets, which draw thousands of buyers and sellers of various goods. The LGA is home to a thriving agricultural industry that grows a wide range of commodities. The residents of Sabon Gari also work in leather goods, hunting and animal rearing, which are key businesses.

== Institutions ==
- Nigerian Institute of Transport Technology, Basawa, Zaria
- Ahmadu Bello University, Samaru, Zaria
- Federal College of Education, Zaria, Kongo, Zaria
- Nigerian Institute of Leather and Science Technology, Samaru, Zaria
- Nigerian College of Aviation Technology
- Nuhu Bamali Polytechnic
