= Makarfi =

- LGA and town
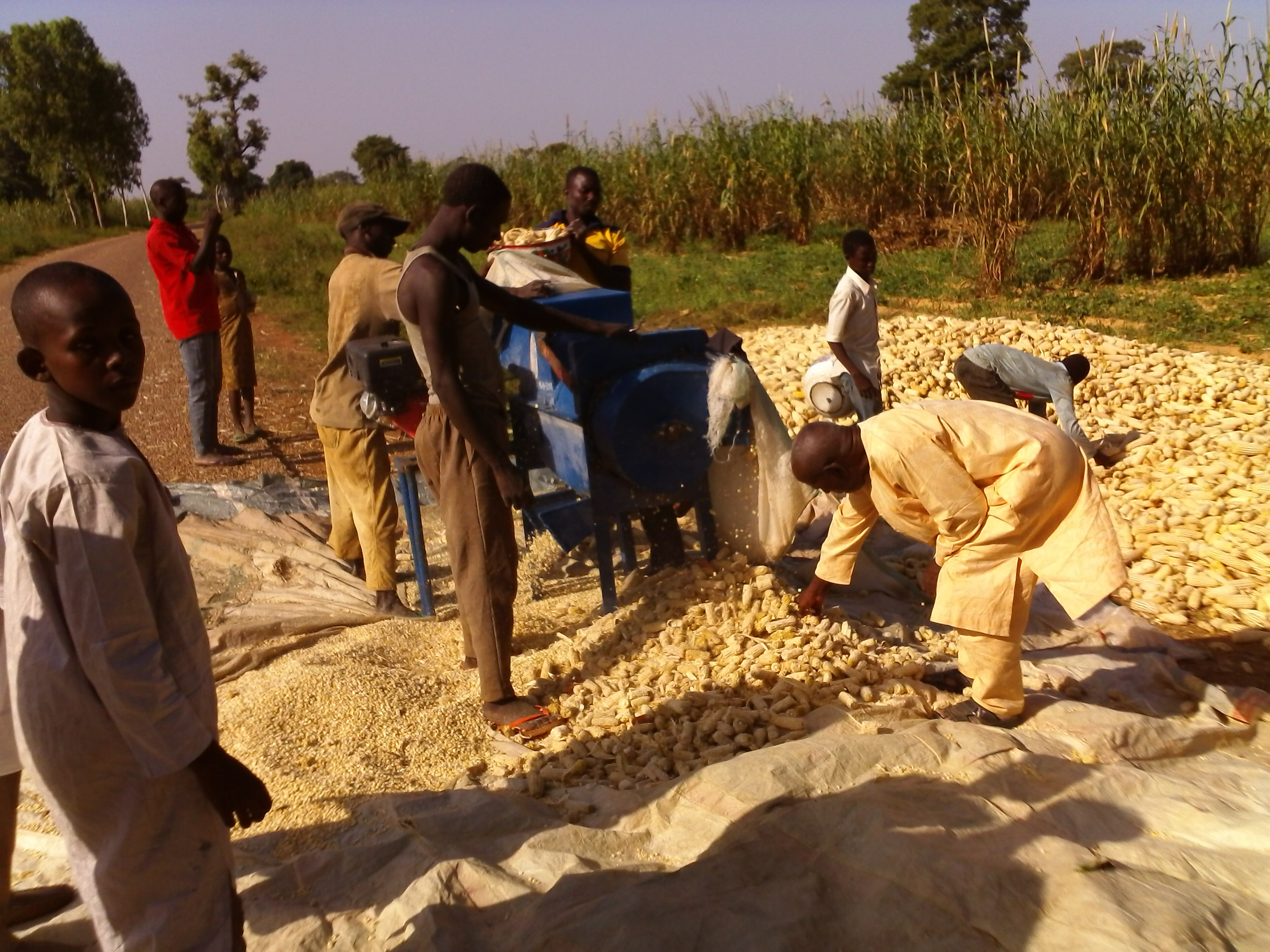
- Farm workers threshing maize at Makarfi
- Interactive map of Makarfi
- Location within Nigeria
- Country: Nigeria
- State: Kaduna State

Government
  - Executive chairman: Kabir Mayare

Area
  - Total: 541 km^{2} (209 sq mi)

Population (2006)
  - Total: 146,259
  - Density: 270/km^{2} (700/sq mi)
- Time zone: UTC+1 (WAT)
- Postal code: 812

Makarfi is a town and local government area in Kaduna State, Nigeria. The local government council is chaired by Kabir Mayare.

It has an area of 541 km^{2}. Its population was 146,259 at the 2006 census.

The major economic activity of the local government area is agriculture.

The postal code of the area is 812.

== Geography ==
Makarfi has a total area of 541 square kilometers. It is located in the Sudan Savannah zone.

== Climate ==
The climate is oppressive, with a year-round temperature range of 12 °C (53 °F) to 36 °C (97 °F), infrequently exceeding 39 °C (102 °F), and being primarily cloudy.

With the mean annual temperature trending positively towards warmer conditions, Makarfi is experiencing a significant transition due to climate change.

The hottest month in Makarfi is April, with an average high temperature of 36 °C (96 °F) and low temperature of 21 °C (70 °F). The cool season lasts for 2.7 months, from July 7 to September 29, with an average daily high temperature below 29 °C (85 °F). January is the coldest month in Makarfi, with an average low temperature of 12 °C (54 °F) and high of 29 °C (84 °F). The hot season lasts for 1.9 months, from March 9 to May 5, with an average daily high temperature above 34 °C (94 °F). The average humidity in the LGA is 29%.

== History ==
Makarfi is an area of Zazzau Emirate which is located at the extreme north of Zaria. The settlement started before the pre-jihad of Zazzau in C1779 to 1792. It become Local government in 1991 when it was created from Ikara local Government in kaduna State.

Makarfi LGA's indigenous communities members are Hausa and Fulani people with strong ties to their ancestral lands and customs. The area's development initiatives concentrate on enhancing vital services like healthcare, education, and infrastructure. In order to ensure that development initiatives are in line with people's needs and values while also protecting their cultural heritage, community engagement is essential.

== Economic Activities ==
Makarfi economic activities are Agriculture and trade. This area is known for production of Agricultural products like Millet, Maize, Sorghum, and Groundnuts. Similarly, Livestock farming of cattle and poultry are economic activities in the area.

== Administrative subdivisions ==
1. Makarfi Ward
2. Tudun Wada Ward
3. Gazara Ward
4. Danguziri Ward
5. Gimi Ward
6. Nasarawan Doya Ward
7. Mayere Ward
8. Gubuchi Ward
9. Gwanki Ward
10. Dandamisa ward
