= Kudan, Nigeria =

Kudan
- Town and LGA
- Interactive map of Kudan
- Country: Nigeria
- State: Kaduna State
- Headquarter: Hunkuyi

Government
  - Type: Local
  - Executive Chairman: Dauda Iliya Abba

Area
  - Total: 345.4 km^{2} (133.4 sq mi)

Population (2006)
  - Total: 138,992
  - Density: 402.4/km^{2} (1,042/sq mi)
- Time zone: UTC+1 (WAT)

Kudan is a town and Local Government Area in Kaduna State, Nigeria. Its headquarters are in the town of Hunkuyi. The Local Government Council is chaired by Honourable Dauda Iliya Abba. There are 10 electoral wards in Kudan local government area.

It has an area of 345.4 km^{2} and a population of 138,992 at the 2006 census. The Local Government currently has a projected population of 205,300.

The postal code of the area is 812.

== Climate ==
In Kudan Local Government Area, The dry season is partly cloudy, the wet season is oppressive and mostly cloudy, and the weather is hot all year round. The average annual temperature fluctuates between 21 and 23 °C (70 and 73 °F), seldom falling above 40 °C (104 °F).

=== Geography ===
Kudan Local Government Area has an average temperature of 32 degrees Celsius or 89.6 degrees Fahrenheit with a total area of 400 square kilometres. The dry and wet seasons are the two distinct seasons that the LGA experiences. The Local Government Area's average wind speed is estimated to be 10 km/h or 6 mph.

== Economic activities ==
Economic activities include hunting, Farming, and blacksmithing. Trade is an essential feature of the economy with the area hosting a number of markets where wide variety of commodities are bought and sold.

Granite and kaolin are the two major mineral resources found in kudan local government.

== Administrative subdivisions ==
1. Doka Ward
2. Garu Ward
3. Hunkuyi Ward
4. Kauran Wali North Ward
5. Kauran Wali South Ward
6. Kudan Ward
7. Likoro Ward
8. Sabon Garin Hunkuyi Ward
9. Taban Sani Ward
10. Zabi Ward

== Notable people ==
1. Alhaji Idris Usman
2. Cigarin Zazzau Late Shehu Ladan
3. Prof. Muhammad Arsala, ABU Zaria
4. Prof. Mu'azu Sa'ad Muhammad, SLU Kafin Hausa, Jigawa State
5. Late Muhammad Ashiru Sarkin Kudan
6. Late Bello Yamusa Jarman Zazzau
7. Dauda Iliya Abba, Executive Chairman
8. Hon. Magaji Sadiq Hunkuyi, former Commissioner
9. Alh. Halliru Mahmud Tukuran Zazzau, District Head Kudan
10. Alhaji Aminu Muhammad Ashiru, Ciritawan Zazzan, District Head Hunkuyi
11. Suleiman Othman Hunkuyi, former Senator, NNPP Gubernatorial Candidate.
12. Isa Ashiru Kudan, former Member House of Representatives, two-time PDP Gubernatorial Candidate.
13. Alhaji Abbas Likoro, Businessman Chairman, Fasada Oil.

== Kingship ==
Kudan Local Government has two districts under the Zazzau Emirate:

1. Kudan District headed by Alhaji Halliru Mahmud Tukuran Zazzau
2. Hunkuyi District headed by Alhaji Aminu Muhammad Ashiru, Ciritawan Zazzau

There are 27 village heads under the two districts.

Moreover, there are other traditional leadership title from Zazzau Emirate currently held by some Kudan Local Government indigenes such as:

1. Sarkin Bai Zazzau, Alhaji Isa Muhammad Ashiru
2. Mayanan Arewan Zazzau Alhaji Sanusi Muhammad Ashiru
3. Wan'yan Zazzau Alhaji Mu'azu Yamusa
4. Shenagun Zazzau Alhaji Mu'azu Shehu Doka

== History ==
Kudan Local Government derived its name from Kudan town which is one of the major towns of the Local Government. The name of the town also derived from Kudandariya who is lead founding father of the town over 600 years ago. The Kadun local government was created in 1996 with headquarters located in hunkuyi, about 136 kilometres from Kaduna the state capital.
