= Ikara =

Ikara [NG.KD.IK]
- LGA and town
- Interactive map of Ikara
- Location within Nigeria
- Coordinates: 11°11′N 8°14′E
- Country: Nigeria
- State: Kaduna State

Government
  - Chairman: Bashir Mamman Dogon Koli
- Time zone: UTC+1 (WAT)

Ikara is a town and local government area (LGA) in Kaduna State, northern Nigeria, located around (85 km) North-East from the city of Zaria. Ikara as a LGA consists of these towns and is located between 10°2¹ to 11°5¹ North and villages: Ikara, Malikachi, Furana, Danlawan, Kurmin Kogi, Janfalan, Auchan, Paki, and Pala.

The Local Government council is chaired by Hon. Bashir Mamman Dogon-Koli.

== Demographics ==
The main ethnic groups of the area include the Hausa and Fulani.

The major religion practiced is Islam.

== Economy ==
=== Agriculture ===
The main occupation of the area's inhabitants is farming. They produce maize, guinea corn, beans, soya beans, rice, cassava, tomatoes, sugar cane, and many other crop products.

== History ==
Ikara local government was created from former Zaria Native Authority following the local government reforms of 1976 at the time of creation. It comprised Ikara, Kubau and Makarfi Districts.

The evolution of human settlement in Ikara was greatly influence by environmental, economic and social considerations. The evolution dates back as far as 1808 when the Jukun people inhabited the town of Ikara. They were immigrants who fled attack of the Muslims scholars from Kano for their refusal to accept Islam. They settled under the Ikara Mountain (Dutsen Lungu) for a brief period of time they later came settle in a plain area near the mountain. The Jukun people were believed to be the founders of Ikara town and name it "Ikara" which means "lets hide here" or "a hiding place" in the Jukun language.

The Maguzawa are people who were originally pagans or who may converted to christianity later in the 20th century. The Maguzawa were originally Hausa speaking people mostly found in area around Katsina, Kano and Northern Zaria.

They were termed “Maguzawa” by the Hausa people and Fulani muslim after the jihad because they did not accept Islam, but retain to tradition pagan worship. However, most of these people, so-called Maguzawa, have been converted to Christians and such cannot be termed maguzawa in real Islamic sense of word; in spite of this, the name persisted.

The Fulani were said to have come and settled in the area mainly for ecological reasons. The Fulani who were mainly (Bororoji) wanderers who came to Ikara because the town was suitable for cattle grazing and probably sought to escape the payment of (Jangali) tax to the rulers of their various area, with large family unit. However, according to oral tradition, in spite of all these settlements, Ikara could not be regarded as there were was no definite ruler over the town until 1879, when Magaji Abubakar, a man who hailed from Kura, a town in Kano State . He organized the settlement into a town and he became the first village head in 1897. He was turbaned by Shehu Kwasau, Sarkin Zazzau (Emir of Zazzau) as the village head with title “Dagachin Ikara ”.

== Administrative Structure ==
This Local Government consists of two districts namely:

- Ikara district
- Paki district

It has six (6) departments, which are as follows:

- Personnel Department
- Finance & Supply Department
- Works Department
- Agricultural Department
- Health Department
- Education Department

== Agriculture ==
This Local Government depends mainly on farming and cattle rearing. Ikara has a strong division of labour according to age and sex. Many men have more than one occupation such as farming and trading. The women of Ikara get money through processing of food and selling food items at home or market places.

== Climate ==
The wet season is oppressive and overcast, with temperatures ranging from 53 °F to 97 °F. The temperature varies throughout the year, though mostly during the dry season.

=== Average Temperature ===
The average daily maximum temperature during the 1.9-month hot season, which runs from March 7 to May 4, is above 94 °F. April is the warmest month of the year in Ikara, with typical high temperatures of 96 °F and low temperatures of 71 °F. The average daily high temperature during the 2.8-month cool season, which runs from July 6 to September 29, is below 85 °F. December is the coldest month of the year in Ikara, with typical highs of 84 °F and lows of 55 °F.

== Education ==
There are thirteen Secondary Schools in this Local Government namely:

- Government science secondary school, Ikara.
- Government Girls Secondary School Ikara.
- Government Secondary School, Ikara.
- Government Vocational Training School, Ikara.
- Government Secondary School, Pala.
- Government Secondary School, Auchan.
- Government Secondary School, Paki.
- Government Secondary School Jamfalan.
- Government Secondary School, Malikanchi.
- Government Secondary School, Danlawal.
- Government Secondary School, Rumi.
- Ikara Comprehensive Academy (Private).
- Raising Star Academy Ikara.
- Emmanuel Nursery, Primary and Secondary School, Gidan Tanko Jamfalan (Private).

Government Secondary School Ikara is a popular secondary school operating in Ikara town, the school is rated high in terms of provision of qualitative education.

== Financial Institutions ==
There is a bank at Ikara and Lead way Assurance is the other financial institution in Ikara LGA Financial Resources

- Unity Bank Ikara Branch.
- Bank of Agriculture (BOA).
- National Bank of Nigeria.
- Federal Statutory allocation which is received on a monthly basis.
- Internally generated revenues from markets, taxable adults and motor parks.

== Government Agencies ==
- Rural Electrification Board (REB)
- NIPOST
- NPC
- NITEL
- Water Board

== Geographical Features ==
There is no distinct geographical features in the LGA The LGA has borders with Makarfi Local Government in the West, Soba in the South, Tudun Wada in Kano State in the North. Kubau by the South.

== Health Facilities ==
There are five comprehensive health centers and forty seven Health Clinics located in the following Area.

- General Hospital, Ikara.
- Comprehensive Health Centre, Paki.
- Comprehensive Health Centre Auchan.

There are Health Clinics under Ikara LGs with four Health Centers located in Ikara itself.

== Industries ==
Ikara food Processing Company (Tomato).

== Judiciary ==
The Local Government has three courts at the headquarters, Ikara, namely:

- Magistrate court
- Upper Sharia court
- Sharia court
- Customary Court

== Mineral Resources ==
- Precious stone
- Limestone deposits

== People ==
Hausas/Fulani

== Population ==
194,723 people (2006 census)

== Postal Address ==
P.M.B 1101, Ikara

== Religion ==
Islam is the dominant religion.

== Recreational Facilities ==
The numerous schools and tertiary institutions provide play grounds for sports and recreational activities in L.G.A.

== Road Network ==
Road Construction received attention during the period of Governor Ahmed Mohammed Makarfi.

Roads are enumerated below:

- Ikara –Tashan Yari Road
- Ikara –Panbeguwa Road
- Anchau –Kudaru Road
- Paki Kwanan Dangora Road of Ƙiru Road
- Anchau- Banki- Wagaho Road
- Ikara –Tudun Wada of Kano State Road
- Kurmin Kogi-Yan Marmara Road
- Ikara –Zaria Road
- Ikara –Furana-Dan Lawal

== Tertiary Institution ==
There are two of them namely

- School of Health Technology, Pambeguwa (moved to Kubau)
- Co-operative Institute Ikara

== Traditional Rulers ==
The following areas are administered by Districts Heads.

- Ikara District
- Kurmin Kogi
- Paki District
- JanFalan
- Pala District

== Tourists Attractions ==
The LGA is inundated with some rocks and Kogi waterfalls.

== Towns and Villages ==
Ikara, Malikachi, Furana, Danlawan, Kurmin Kogi, Janfalan, Auchan, Paki, Pala, Saulawa, Rumi, Saya-saya, Kuya
