= Igabi =

- LGA
- Interactive map of Igabi
- Location in Nigeria
- Coordinates: 10°47′0″N 7°46′0″E
- Country: Nigeria
- State: Kaduna State
- Headquarters: Turunku

Government
  - Executive Chairman: Sani Abdul Zangon Aya

Area
  - Total: 3,222 km^{2} (1,244 sq mi)

Population (2022 est)
  - Total: 636,400
  - Density: 197.5/km^{2} (511.6/sq mi)
- Time zone: UTC+1 (WAT)

Igabi is a Local Government Area (LGA) of Kaduna State, Nigeria. It is chaired by the Executive Chairman - Jabir Khamis, It is one of 774 local government areas in Nigeria. Rigasa ward is under Igabi LGA, one of the most populous wards in the state.

== History ==
Research by the DRPC Nigeria (Development Research and Projects Center Nigeria) has shown that Igabi was founded by a man from Kukawa in Borno state; the man was a Qur'anic scholar who settled near Rigachikun to teach Qur'an and Islamic studies in the region due to an overflow of Hausa people to the northeastern Nigeria especially Borno state in search of Islamic religious knowledge. The current local government's capital is Turunku. The genesis of Igabi town that led to local government was a man named Igabi who came and settled in the area. The man was from Borna named Mallam Ahmadu, an Islamic scholar who arrived at the site where he founded the town with a large number of Almajirai (students), numbering more than a hundred. Later more students from neighboring villages around joined him.

in 1907, Igabi was officially recognized as a district under Zazzau Emirate by the British colonial government of Northern Nigeria and the first district head was Turaki Babba of Zazzau. After the death of Turaki Babba in the early 1950s the leadership was transferred to Dan Madami Zubairu, then to Dan Madami Umaru and now Bello Sani.

The first confirmed H5N1 (bird flu) outbreak in an African country was on 8 February 2006, on a commercial chicken farm in Jaji, a village in Igabi.

== Demographic ==
The indigenous people of Igabi are predominantly Muslims with the exception of Gbagyi who were non Muslims or traditionalist and they later accepted Christianity.

== Administrative subdivisions ==
There are 12 wards in Igabi Local government Area of Kaduna state, these are;

1. Afaka ward
2. Birnin Yero ward
3. Gadan Gayan ward
4. Gwaraji ward
5. Igabi ward
6. Kerawa ward
7. Kwarau ward
8. Rigachikun ward
9. Rigasa ward
10. Sabon Birnin Daji ward
11. Turunku ward
12. Zangon Aya ward

== Geography ==
The area around Igabi Local Government Area experiences an average temperature of 32 degrees Celsius or 89.6 degrees Fahrenheit and a humidity of 48%. The Local Government Area experiences two distinct seasons, known as the dry and the wet seasons, with an average wind speed of 11 km/h or 6.8 mph.

=== Climate ===
With an average yearly temperature of 28 °C (82 °F) and 128.91 days with precipitation, the savanna climate in Igabi is tropical wet and dry.

== Health care facilities ==
There are several public and private hospital in Igabi. which are:

1. PHC IGABI PRIMARY

== Education ==
There are primary, secondary and tertiary education institutions in Igabi. The first Igabi primary school was established in 1945 at Rigachikun.

The Armed Forces Command and Staff College is a military training institution which was founded in May 1976, so also Demonstration Battalion, The Army School of Infantry are located at Jaji.

The Nigerian Tulip International College (NTIC) formerly Nigerian Turkish is located at Rigachikun. National Open University of Nigeria (NOUN) is located in Igabi Local Government as part of community service organized educational activities among primary and secondary schools in the area.

== Economy ==
The economy of Igabi largely depends on agriculture and makes it one of the largest contributors to the domestic product in the state, with a total output of about $10m. Igabi contribute economically to kaduna state in term of production of maize in large quantity. Also production of feed for animals consumption this led to socio - economic growth.
