= Giwa =

- LGA and town
- Interactive map of Giwa
- Country: Nigeria
- State: Kaduna State

Government
  - Executive Chairman: Ahmad Samaila Abdullahi Yakawada

Area
  - Total: 2,066 km^{2} (798 sq mi)

Population (2006)
  - Total: 286,427
  - Density: 138.6/km^{2} (359.1/sq mi)
- Time zone: UTC+1 (WAT)
- Postal code: 810

Giwa is a town and Local Government Area of Kaduna State, Nigeria. The Government Council is chaired by Ahmad Sama'ila yakawada .

It was created on 15 September 1991, by the then president and the Grand Commander of the Federal Republic of Nigeria, General Ibrahim Badamasi Babangida GCFR, out of Igabi Local Government Area of Kaduna State. It was created to improve service delivery to local residents and increase administrative effectiveness. Giwa has grown to be an important component of the state's local government system over time, supporting the socioeconomic advancement of Kaduna State. The postal code of Giwa Local Government Area is 810.

== History ==
Giwa as a local government in Kaduna from Igabi local Government in 1991 by General Ibrahim badamasi Babangida in military head of state at that time. The Hausa and Fulani are main ethnic groups which both have strong cultural traditions, make up the majority of Giwa's population. The Giwa people have a strong agricultural heritage, observe customs, and enjoy traditional festivals. The local population's ideals and identity are preserved through communal events, music, and traditional clothing.

== Economic activities in Giwa ==
The major economic activity and occupation of the people are agriculture products farming such as onions, tomatoes, water melons and cucumbers. The livestock farming of cows and rams is also their activities. There is a weekly market known as Giwa market in which different goods and services and sold.

== Geography ==
It has an area of 2,066 km^{2} and a population of 286,427 at the 2006 census. It has 11 wards which are shika, Idasu, Kadaga, Danmahawayi, Kidandan, Galadimawa, Gangara, Giwa, Kakangi, Pan Hauya and yakawada also with 2 development area Administrative/ Councils. It is located in the North-West of Kaduna State.

== Climate ==
The climate is hot all year round because the wet season is oppressively hot and cloudy, while the dry season is partly cloudy.

Giwa is seeing higher temperatures as a result of climate change, and heat waves are happening more frequently.

The Local Government Area has an average annual temperature of 34 degrees Celsius or 93.2 degrees Fahrenheit and an average annual precipitation total of 1100 millimetres or 43.3 inches.

== Administrative Sub-divisions ==
Giwa Local Government Area consists of 11 subdivisions called Wards (second-order administrative divisions)

1. Giwa Ward.
2. Danmahawayi Ward.
3. Idasu Ward.
4. Pan Hauya Ward.
5. Galadimawa Ward.
6. Kadage Ward.
7. Shika Ward.
8. Gangara Ward.
9. Kakangi Ward.
10. Kidandan Ward.
11. Yakawada Ward.

=== Educational Activities in Giwa ===
There are several secondary and primary schools in different wards in Giwa local government for educational activities.
