= 2023 Nigerian Senate elections in Kaduna State =

2023 Senate elections in Kaduna

- 25 February 2023

All 3 Kaduna State seats in the Senate of Nigeria
	Majority party	Minority party
Party	APC	PDP
Last election	2	1
Seats before	2	1
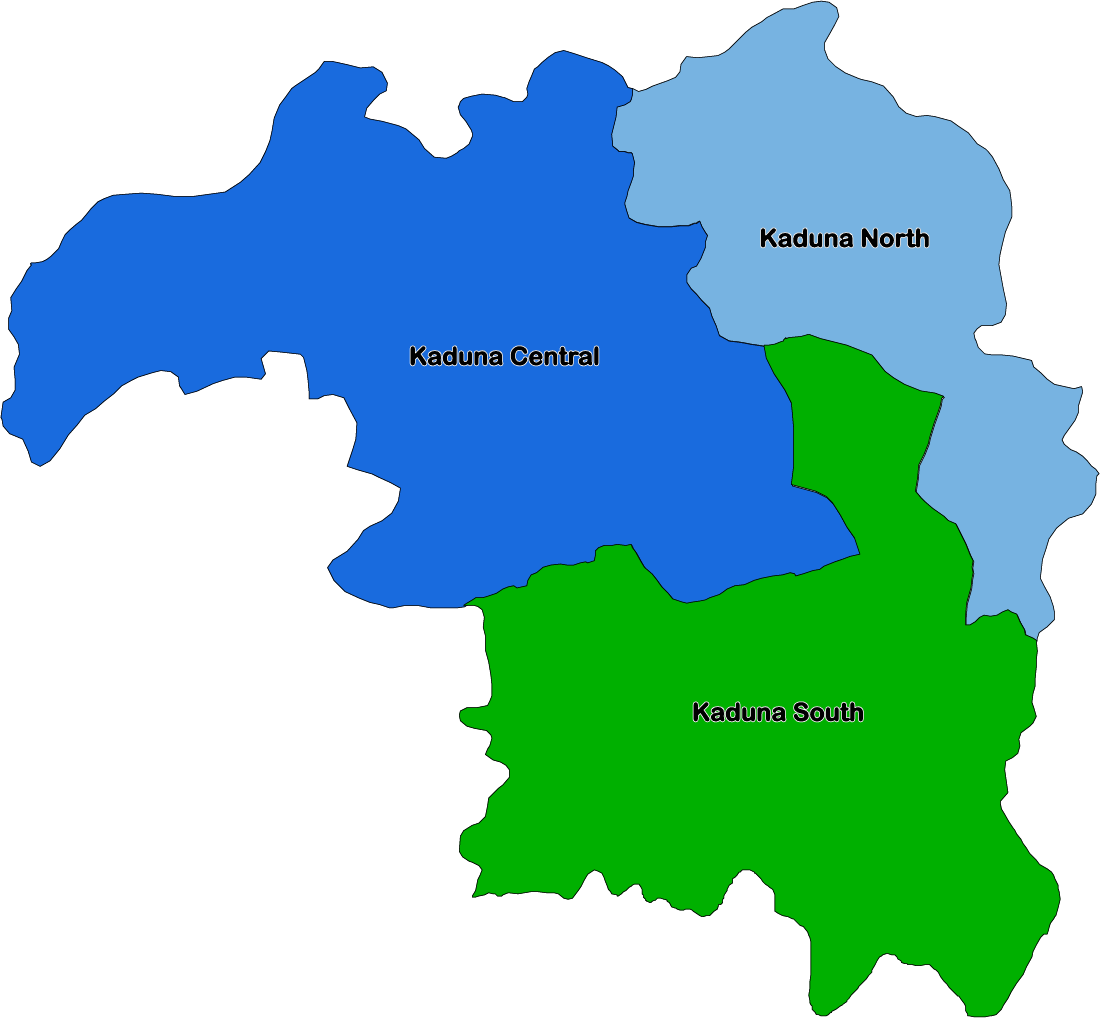
- APC incumbent retiring APC incumbent running for re-election PDP incumbent lost renomination

The 2023 Nigerian Senate elections in Kaduna State were held on 25 February 2023, to elect the 3 federal Senators from Kaduna State, one from each of the state's three senatorial districts. The elections coincided with the 2023 presidential election, as well as other elections to the Senate and elections to the House of Representatives; with state elections being held two weeks later. Primaries were held between 4 April and 9 June 2022.

== Background ==
In the previous Senate elections, only one incumbent senator was returned: in the South district, Danjuma Laah (PDP) was re-elected but Shehu Sani (PRP-Central) and Suleiman Othman Hunkuyi (PDP-North) both lost re-election. In the South district, Laah held his seat with 64% of the vote; both of the open seats were won back by APC as Uba Sani won the North district with 56% and Suleiman Abdu Kwari gained the Central seat with 68% of the vote. These results were a part of a slight swing to the Kaduna APC as most House of Representatives seats were won by the party, it won a majority in the House of Assembly, and Buhari won the state in the presidential election.

== Overview ==
Affiliation	Party		Total
Affiliation	APC	PDP	Total
Previous Election	2	1	3
Before Election	2	1	3
After Election	0	3	3

== Summary ==
District	Incumbent		Results	
District	Incumbent	Party	Status	Candidates
Kaduna Central	Uba Sani	APC	Incumbent retired New member elected PDP gain	▌Muhammad Sani Abdullahi (APC); ▌ ✓ Lawal Adamu Usman (PDP)
Kaduna North	Suleiman Abdu Kwari	APC	Incumbent lost re-election New member elected PDP gain	▌Suleiman Abdu Kwari (APC); ▌Michael Ayuba (LP); ▌ ✓ Khalid Mustapha (PDP)
Kaduna South	Danjuma Laah	PDP	Incumbent lost renomination New member elected PDP hold	▌Bulus Audu (APC); ▌ ✓ Sunday Marshall Katunɡ (PDP)

== Kaduna Central ==
2023 Kaduna Central Senatorial District election
- 25 February 2023
Nominee	Muhammad Sani Abdullahi	Lawal Adamu Usman
Party	APC	PDP
Senator before election
Uba Sani
APC
Elected Senator
TBD

The Kaduna Central Senatorial District covers the local government areas of Birnin Gwari, Chikun, Giwa, Igabi, Kaduna North, Kaduna South, and Kajuru. The incumbent Uba Sani (APC) was elected with 55.8% of the vote in 2019. In March 2022, Sani announced that he would run for governor of Kaduna State instead of seeking re-election.

=== Primary elections ===
==== All Progressives Congress ====
On 20 April 2022, the APC National Executive Committee announced the party's schedule for senatorial primaries, setting its expression of interest form price at ₦3 million and nomination form price at ₦17 million with a 50% discount for candidates younger than 40 while women and candidates with disabilities get free nomination forms. Forms were to be sold from 26 April to 6 May until the deadline was later extended to 10 May then 12 May. After the submission of nomination forms by 13 May, candidates were screened by a party committee on 14 and 15 May while 18 May was the date for the screening appeal process. Ward congresses and LGA congresses were set for 16 and 17 May to elect delegates for the primary. Candidates approved by the screening process advanced to a primary set for 27 May, in concurrence with other APC senatorial primaries; challenges to the result could be made on 28 May.

The APC senatorial primary was heavily affected by the party's gubernatorial primary. The Governor Nasir Ahmad el-Rufai-aligned camp of the Kaduna APC (which Sani was a part of) held an endorsement process to decide on a single gubernatorial candidate from former commissioner Muhammad Sani Abdullahi, Senator Uba Sani, and Deputy Governor Hadiza Sabuwa Balarabe; eventually Sani was selected as the gubernatorial candidate while Abdullahi was to run to replace Sani in the Senate and Balarabe would become Sani's running mate. Abdullahi promptly withdrew from the gubernatorial race and entered the senatorial primary in early May. On the primary date, an indirect primary resulted Abdullahi being nominated unopposed as the two other candidates—Rabi Salisu and Usman Garba—withdrew.

APC primary results
Party	Candidate	Votes	%
APC	Muhammad Sani Abdullahi	388	100.00%
Total votes		388	100.00%
Invalid or blank votes		8	N/A
Turnout		396	100.00%

==== People's Democratic Party ====
On 16 March 2022, the national PDP announced its senatorial primary timetable, setting its expression of interest form price at ₦1 million and the nomination form price at ₦20 million with a 50% discount for candidates between 25 and 30. Forms were to be sold until 1 April but the party later extended the deadline four times before reaching a final deadline of 22 April. After the submission of nomination forms by 25 April, candidates were screened by a party committee on 27 April while 2 May was the rescheduled date for the screening appeal process. Ward congresses were set for 29 April and LGA congresses were rescheduled for 10 May to elect delegates for the primary. Candidates approved by the screening process advanced to a primary set for 23 May, in concurrence with other PDP senatorial primaries but due to often violently enforced Monday stay-at-home orders by separatists, southeastern state parties held their primaries on 24 May; challenges to the result could be made on 25 May.

On the primary date, Lawal Adamu Usman—the 2019 nominee—defeating runner-up Usman Ibrahim and four other candidates to emerge victorious. However, the state party initially annulled the primary, citing the National Assembly Appeal Committee's report and recommendation. The party later backtracked and accepted Usman as nominee despite protests from Ibrahim who claimed to have video evidence of over-voting during the primary. Ibrahim went onto sue the PDP for a new primary; Justice Muhammed Umar of a Federal High Court ruled in favor of Ibrahim on 2 November and ordered a new primary to be conducted. The new primary was held on 8 November with Ibrahim defeating Usman and four other candidates by a wide margin; however, the state PDP noted that Usman would be reinstated as nominee if his judicial appeal was successful. On 17 February, the Supreme Court ruled in favor of Usman, reinstating him as nominee just about a week before the election.

PDP primary results
Party	Candidate	Votes	%
PDP	Lawal Adamu Usman	99	39.92%
PDP	Usman Ibrahim	84	33.87%
PDP	Musa Bello	43	17.34%
PDP	Ahmed Inuwa	15	6.05%
PDP	Talatu Shehu	5	2.02%
PDP	Usman Muhammed	2	0.81%
Total votes		248	100.00%
Invalid or blank votes		0	N/A
Turnout		248	Unknown

Annulled rerun primary results

PDP rerun primary results
Party	Candidate	Votes	%
PDP	Usman Ibrahim	210	96.77%
PDP	Lawal Adamu Usman	5	2.30%
PDP	Usman Muhammed	2	0.92%
PDP	Other candidates	0	0.00%
Total votes		217	100.00%
Invalid or blank votes		Unknown	N/A
Turnout		217	Unknown

=== Campaign ===
During the primary period, pundits viewed the Central district as the most competitive of Kaduna's senate seats as observers noted that the lack of Sani's incumbency advantage had boosted PDP prospects. However, early November brought a new surprise to the race as Usman was removed as PDP nominee by a court ruling that annulled its primary due to overvoting and ordered a new primary to be conducted. Usman lost the rerun primary to Ibrahim; however, the state PDP noted that Usman would be reinstated as nominee if his judicial appeal was successful.

In terms of the general election campaign, reporting from The Nation labeled the seat as a bellwether for the state at-large. The analysis also labeled Abdullahi as the frontrunner due to the PDP infighting and court battle. Just about a week before the election, the Supreme Court ruled in favor of Usman, reinstating him as PDP nominee.

=== General election ===
==== Results ====
2023 Kaduna Central Senatorial District election
Party	Candidate	Votes	%
AA	Olakunle Akinsoyinu		
APP	Umar Mansur		
ADC	Ibrahim Musa		
APC	Muhammad Sani Abdullahi		
APGA	Samuel Kattey Gankon		
APM	Chichet Bala		
LP	Muhammad Sani Ibrahim		
NRM	Ismail Aliyu		
New Nigeria Peoples Party	Ahmad Tijjani Umar		
PRP	Mohammed Ali		
PDP	Lawal Adamu Usman		
SDP	Hajara Idris		
Total votes			100.00%
Invalid or blank votes			N/A
Turnout			

== Kaduna North ==
2023 Kaduna North Senatorial District election
- 25 February 2023
Nominee	Suleiman Abdu Kwari	Khalid Mustapha
Party	APC	PDP
Senator before election
Suleiman Abdu Kwari
APC
Elected Senator
TBD

The Kaduna North Senatorial District covers the local government areas of Ikara, Kubau, Kudan, Lere, Makarfi, Sabon Gari, Soba, and Zaria. The incumbent Suleiman Abdu Kwari (APC), who was elected with 67.7% of the vote in 2019, is seeking re-election.

=== Primary elections ===
==== All Progressives Congress ====
On 20 April 2022, the APC National Executive Committee announced the party's schedule for senatorial primaries, setting its expression of interest form price at ₦3 million and nomination form price at ₦17 million with a 50% discount for candidates younger than 40 while women and candidates with disabilities get free nomination forms. Forms were to be sold from 26 April to 6 May until the deadline was later extended to 10 May then 12 May. After the submission of nomination forms by 13 May, candidates were screened by a party committee on 14 and 15 May while 18 May was the date for the screening appeal process. Ward congresses and LGA congresses were set for 16 and 17 May to elect delegates for the primary. Candidates approved by the screening process advanced to a primary set for 27 May, in concurrence with other APC senatorial primaries; challenges to the result could be made on 28 May.

The primary was beset by violence when armed assailants attacked the Zaria venue during voting, injuring several delegates and stealing journalists' cameras and electronics. Nonetheless, the results were announced later that day with Kwari winning renomination nearly unanimously. Both of his challengers—Haliru Ibrahim and Turad Sani Sha'aban (son of former MHR Sani Sha'aban and son-in-law of President Muhammadu Buhari)—rejected the results with Ibrahim suing the party while groups opposed to Kwari called for Kwari's disqualification. By September, hearings began on Ibrahim's suit to have himself declared the legitimate nominee.

APC primary results
Party	Candidate	Votes	%
APC	Suleiman Abdu Kwari	406	99.75%
APC	Haliru Ibrahim	1	0.25%
APC	Turad Sani Sha'aban	0	0.00%
Total votes		407	100.00%
Invalid or blank votes		4	N/A
Turnout		411	100.00%

==== People's Democratic Party ====
On 16 March 2022, the national PDP announced its senatorial primary timetable, setting its expression of interest form price at ₦1 million and the nomination form price at ₦20 million with a 50% discount for candidates between 25 and 30. Forms were to be sold until 1 April but the party later extended the deadline four times before reaching a final deadline of 22 April. After the submission of nomination forms by 25 April, candidates were screened by a party committee on 27 April while 2 May was the rescheduled date for the screening appeal process. Ward congresses were set for 29 April and LGA congresses were rescheduled for 10 May to elect delegates for the primary. Candidates approved by the screening process advanced to a primary set for 23 May, in concurrence with other PDP senatorial primaries but due to often violently enforced Monday stay-at-home orders by separatists, southeastern state parties held their primaries on 24 May; challenges to the result could be made on 25 May.

The primary resulted in the sole candidate—Khalid Mustapha—winning the nomination by affirmation. After the primary, Mustapha expressed gratitude to the delegates and urged party members to work for a general election victory.

=== Campaign ===
During the primary period, observers noted that the PDP seemed not to be strongly contesting the seat due to its strong APC lean. By December 2022, that analysis remained due to Kwari's reported strength as a candidate along with potential vote splitting between the PDP and NNPP.

=== General election ===
==== Results ====
2023 Kaduna North Senatorial District election
Party	Candidate	Votes	%
ADC	Suleiman Abdullahi		
APC	Suleiman Abdu Kwari		
APM	Sambo Yakubu		
LP	Sidi Ibrahim Bamalli		
New Nigeria Peoples Party	Usman Shehu Bawa		
PRP	Abdullahi Wakili Ahmad		
PDP	Khalid Mustapha		
SDP	Adamu Rabiu		
ZLP	Muntari Ussaini		
Total votes			100.00%
Invalid or blank votes			N/A
Turnout			

== Kaduna South ==
2023 Kaduna South Senatorial District election
- 25 February 2023
Nominee	Bulus Audu	Michael Ayuba	Sunday Marshall Katunɡ
Party	APC	LP	PDP
Senator before election
Danjuma Laah
APC
Elected Senator
TBD

The Kaduna South Senatorial District covers the local government areas of Jaba, Jema'a, Kachia, Kagarko, Kaura, Kauru, Sanga, and Zangon Kataf; it is largely coterminous with the Southern Kaduna region, noted for its ethnic diversity and Christian majority in a state that is mainly ethnic Hausa-Fulani and majority Muslim. Incumbent Danjuma Laah (PDP) was elected with 64.4% of the vote in 2019 and sought re-election but lost the PDP nomination.

=== Primary elections ===
==== All Progressives Congress ====
On 20 April 2022, the APC National Executive Committee announced the party's schedule for senatorial primaries, setting its expression of interest form price at ₦3 million and nomination form price at ₦17 million with a 50% discount for candidates younger than 40 while women and candidates with disabilities get free nomination forms. Forms were to be sold from 26 April to 6 May until the deadline was later extended to 10 May then 12 May. After the submission of nomination forms by 13 May, candidates were screened by a party committee on 14 and 15 May while 18 May was the date for the screening appeal process. Ward congresses and LGA congresses were set for 16 and 17 May to elect delegates for the primary. Candidates approved by the screening process advanced to a primary set for 27 May, in concurrence with other APC senatorial primaries; challenges to the result could be made on 28 May.

On the primary date, an indirect primary in Kafanchan ended with Bulus Audu—an aide to Governor Nasir Ahmad el-Rufai—emerging as the nominee by voice vote after his sole opponent—Anthony Hassan—withdrew right before the primary. In his acceptance speech, Audu thanked Hassan and delegates before vowing to bring development to the district.

==== People's Democratic Party ====
On 16 March 2022, the national PDP announced its senatorial primary timetable, setting its expression of interest form price at ₦1 million and the nomination form price at ₦20 million with a 50% discount for candidates between 25 and 30. Forms were to be sold until 1 April but the party later extended the deadline four times before reaching a final deadline of 22 April. After the submission of nomination forms by 25 April, candidates were screened by a party committee on 27 April while 2 May was the rescheduled date for the screening appeal process. Ward congresses were set for 29 April and LGA congresses were rescheduled for 10 May to elect delegates for the primary. Candidates approved by the screening process advanced to a primary set for 23 May, in concurrence with other PDP senatorial primaries but due to often violently enforced Monday stay-at-home orders by separatists, southeastern state parties held their primaries on 24 May; challenges to the result could be made on 25 May.

The primary, held in Kafanchan, resulted in Laah losing the nomination to Sunday Marshall Katunɡ—former House of Representatives member for Zangon Kataf/Jaba. Katunɡ received 112 votes compared to Laah's 74 votes and third place MHR Shehu Nicholas Garba's 52 votes.

PDP primary results
Party	Candidate	Votes	%
PDP	Sunday Marshall Katunɡ	112	42.11%
PDP	Danjuma Laah	74	27.82%
PDP	Shehu Nicholas Garba	52	19.55%
PDP	Samson Monday Dikko	21	7.89%
PDP	Jagaba Adams Jagaba	7	2.63%
PDP	Other candidates	0	0.00%
Total votes		266	100.00%

=== Campaign ===
During the primary period, observers noted that the APC seemed not to be strongly contesting the seat due to its strong PDP lean. However, by December 2022, reporting from The Nation categorized the election as newly competitive due to the lack of incumbent and the rise of the LP in the region.

=== General election ===
==== Results ====
2023 Kaduna South Senatorial District election
Party	Candidate	Votes	%
ADC	Luti Kuti		
APC	Bulus Audu		
LP	Michael Ayuba		
NRM	Adams Suleiman		
New Nigeria Peoples Party	Ahmed Rufai Chanchangi		
PRP	Babalo Nuruddeen Babalo		
PDP	Sunday Marshall Katunɡ		
SDP	Habibu Murtala		
ZLP	Yusuf Ishaku		
Total votes			100.00%
Invalid or blank votes			N/A
Turnout			

== See also ==
- 2023 Nigerian Senate election
- 2023 Nigerian elections
