= 2015 Nigerian Senate elections in Kaduna State =

2015 Nigerian Senate election in Kaduna State

The 2015 Nigerian Senate election in Kaduna State was held on March 28, 2015, to elect members of the Nigerian Senate to represent Kaduna State. Shehu Sani representing Kaduna Central and Suleiman Othman Hunkuyi representing Kaduna North won on the platform of All Progressives Congress, while Danjuma Laah representing Kaduna South won on the platform of Peoples Democratic Party.

== Overview ==
Affiliation	Party		Total
Affiliation	APC	PDP	Total
Before Election			3
After Election	2	1	3

== Summary ==
District	Incumbent	Party	Elected Senator	Party
Kaduna Central			Shehu Sani	APC
Kaduna North			Suleiman Othman Hunkuyi	APC
Kaduna South			Danjuma Laah	PDP

== Results ==
=== Kaduna Central ===
All Progressives Congress candidate Shehu Sani won the election, defeating People's Democratic Party candidate Mohammed Aruwa and other party candidates.

2015 Nigerian Senate election in Kaduna State
Party	Candidate	Votes	%
APC	Shehu Sani		
PDP	Mohammed Aruwa		
Total votes			
APC hold			

=== Kaduna North ===
All Progressives Congress candidate Suleiman Othman Hunkuyi won the election, defeating People's Democratic Party candidate Ahmed Makarfi and other party candidates.

2015 Nigerian Senate election in Kaduna State
Party	Candidate	Votes	%
APC	Suleiman Othman Hunkuyi		
PDP	Ahmed Makarfi		
Total votes			
APC hold			

=== Kaduna South ===
Peoples Democratic Party candidate Danjuma Laah won the election, defeating All Progressives Congress candidate Ishaku Shekarau and other party candidates.

2015 Nigerian Senate election in Kaduna State
Party	Candidate	Votes	%
PDP	Danjuma Laah		
APC	Ishaku Shekarau		
Total votes			
PDP hold			
