= 1999 Nigerian Senate elections in Kaduna State =

1999 Nigerian Senate election in Kaduna State

The 1999 Nigerian Senate election in Kaduna State was held on February 20, 1999, to elect members of the Nigerian Senate to represent Kaduna State. Dalhatu Tafida representing Kaduna North and Haruna Aziz Zeego representing Kaduna South won on the platform of Peoples Democratic Party, while Mohammed Aruwa representing Kaduna Central won on the platform of the All Nigeria Peoples Party.

== Overview ==
Affiliation	Party		Total
Affiliation	PDP	ANPP	Total
Before Election			3
After Election	2	1	3

== Summary ==
District	Incumbent	Party	Elected Senator	Party
Kaduna North			Dalhatu Tafida	PDP
Kaduna South			Haruna Aziz Zeego	PDP
Kaduna Central			Mohammed Aruwa	ANPP

== Results ==
=== Kaduna North ===
The election was won by Dalhatu Tafida of the Peoples Democratic Party.

1999 Nigerian Senate election in Kaduna State
Party	Candidate	Votes	%
PDP	Dalhatu Tafida		
Total votes			
PDP hold			

=== Kaduna South ===
The election was won by Haruna Aziz Zeego of the Peoples Democratic Party.

1999 Nigerian Senate election in Kaduna State
Party	Candidate	Votes	%
PDP	Haruna Aziz Zeego		
Total votes			
PDP hold			

=== Kaduna Central ===
The election was won by Mohammed Aruwa of the All Nigeria Peoples Party.

1999 Nigerian Senate election in Kaduna State
Party	Candidate	Votes	%
ANPP	Mohammed Aruwa		
Total votes			
ANPP hold			
