= 2019 Nigerian Senate elections in Kaduna State =

The 2019 Nigerian Senate election in Kaduna State held on February 23, 2019, to elect members of the Nigerian Senate to represent Kaduna State. Kwari Suleiman Abdu representing Kaduna North, Sani Uba representing Kaduna Central both won on the platform of All Progressives Congress. while Laah Danjuma Tella representing Kaduna South returned to parliament on the platform of People's Democratic Party

== Overview ==
Affiliation	Party			Total
Affiliation	APC	PDP	Others	Total
Before Election	0	2	1	3
After Election	2	1	0	3

== Summary ==
District	Incumbent	Party	Elected Senator	Party
Kaduna Central	Shehu Sani	PRP	Sani Uba	APC
Kaduna North	Suleiman Othman Hunkuyi	PDP	Kwari Suleiman Abdu	APC
Kaduna South	Laah Danjuma Tella	PDP	Laah Danjuma Tella	PDP

== Results ==
=== Kaduna Central ===
A total of 24 candidates registered with the Independent National Electoral Commission to contest in the election. APC candidate Sani Uba won the election, defeating PDP candidate Usman Lawal Adamu and 22 other party candidates. Sani received 55.78% of the votes, while Usman Adamu received 30.70%

2019 Nigerian Senate election in Kaduna State
Party	Candidate	Votes	%
APC	Sani Uba	355,242	55.78%
PDP	Usman Lawal Adamu	195,497	30.70%
Others		86,075	13.52%
Total votes		636,814	100%
APC hold			

=== Kaduna North ===
A total of 20 candidates registered with the Independent National Electoral Commission to contest in the election. APC candidate Kwari Suleiman Abdu won the election, defeating PDP candidate Hunkuyi Othman Suleiman and 28 other party candidates. Kwari received 67.68% of the votes, while Hunkuyi received 29.93%

2019 Nigerian Senate election in Kano State
Party	Candidate	Votes	%
APC	Kwari Suleiman Abdu	411,497	67.68%
PDP	Hunkuyi Othman Suleiman	181,955	29.93%
Others		14,499	2.38%
Total votes		607,951	100%
APC hold			

=== Kaduna South ===
A total of 12 candidates registered with the Independent National Electoral Commission to contest in the election. PDP candidate Laah Danjuma Tella won the election, defeating APC candidate Bala Barnabas Yusuf and 10 other party candidates. Laah received 64.35% of the votes, while Barnabas received 31.89%

2019 Nigerian Senate election in Kaduna State
Party	Candidate	Votes	%
PDP	Laah Danjuma Tella	268,923	64.35%
APC	Bala Barnabas Yusuf	133,287	31.89%
Others		15,675	3.75%
Total votes		417,885	100%
APC hold			
