= 2011 Nigerian Senate elections in Kaduna State =

2011 Nigerian Senate election in Kaduna State

The 2011 Nigerian Senate election in Kaduna State was held on April 9, 2011, to elect members of the Nigerian Senate to represent Kaduna State. Yusuf Datti Baba-Ahmed representing Kaduna North and Mohammed Saleh representing Kaduna Central won on the platform of Congress for Progressive Change, while Nenadi Usman representing Kaduna South on the platform of Peoples Democratic Party.

== Overview ==
Affiliation	Party		Total
Affiliation	CPC	PDP	Total
Before Election			3
After Election	2	1	3

== Summary ==
District	Incumbent	Party	Elected Senator	Party
Kaduna North			Yusuf Datti Baba-Ahmed	CPC
Kaduna Central			Mohammed Saleh	CPC
Kaduna South			Nenadi Usman	PDP

== Results ==
=== Kaduna North ===
Congress for Progressive Change candidate Yusuf Datti Baba-Ahmed won the election, defeating other party candidates.

2011 Nigerian Senate election in Kaduna State
Party	Candidate	Votes	%
CPC	Yusuf Datti Baba-Ahmed		
Total votes			
CPC hold			

=== Kaduna Central ===
Congress for Progressive Change candidate Mohammed Saleh won the election, defeating other party candidates.

2011 Nigerian Senate election in Kaduna State
Party	Candidate	Votes	%
CPC	Mohammed Saleh		
Total votes			
CPC hold			

=== Kaduna South ===
Peoples Democratic Party candidate Nenadi Usman won the election, defeating party candidates.

2011 Nigerian Senate election in Kaduna State
Party	Candidate	Votes	%
PDP	Nenadi Usman		
Total votes			
PDP hold			
