= Abigail Marshall Katung =

British politician

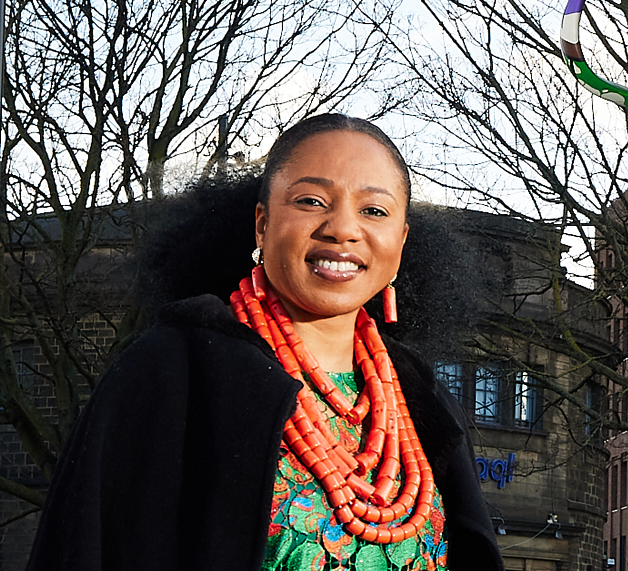

Lord Mayor of Leeds
- In office 2024–2025
- Preceded by: Al Garthwaite
- Succeeded by: Dan Cohen

Leeds City Councillor for Little London and Woodhouse Ward
- Incumbent
- Assumed office 2019

Personal details
- Born: Abigail Wok Haruna-Musa; 7 December 1975 (age 50) North Central State (now Kaduna State), Nigeria
- Party: Labour Co-op
- Education: University of Leeds

Abigail Marshall Katung (born 7 December 1975) is a Nigerian-British politician and wife of the senator representing the Kaduna South senatorial district, Kaduna State, Nigeria, Sunday Marshall Katung. She was born and raised in Nigeria, but moved to the United Kingdom to study at the University of Leeds and, as of January 2024, is a governor at the Leeds City College. In May 2024, she took up the position of Lord Mayor of Leeds, becoming the first elected councillor from Africa to hold the council position, the second black person after Eileen Taylor, and the 130th of all. Abigail was also reported to have held various roles within the Leeds City Council, including “chairing the scrutiny board for adult health and active lifestyles and the scrutiny board for infrastructure, investment, and inclusive growth.

== Career ==
She is a co-chair of the David Oluwale Memorial Association (DOMA) in memory of David Oluwale, a Nigerian migrant to the UK who arrived Leeds in 1949, but got drowned in River Aire in 1969 with two British police officers held responsible for his death. In November 1971, the prosecution of those police officers made it the first and only time any prosecution for the death of a black person would be successfully carried out against state officials.

In May 2019 at the Leeds City Council elections, Katung was elected as a councillor for the Little London and Woodhouse ward, making her the first African to be elected to the council.

As of 2020, she was a lead member for the BAME and a BAME staff network member champion in Leeds.

In 2022, she co-chaired Leeds City Council's official ‘Food Champion’ alongside the CEO of FareShare Yorkshire, Gareth Batty MBE FRSA. She was also present as a special guest at the Jordan Sinnott Memorial Award at St. Mary's, Menston.

After serving an initial term, she contested again and won the Little London and Woodhouse election in May 2023.

In January 2024, she was elected as the next Lord Mayor of Leeds under the Labour and Co-operative Party, succeeding Al Garthwaite. Her election was for the 2024/2025 term. Katung was the first African to hold the position of Lord Mayor in the city.

== Personal life ==
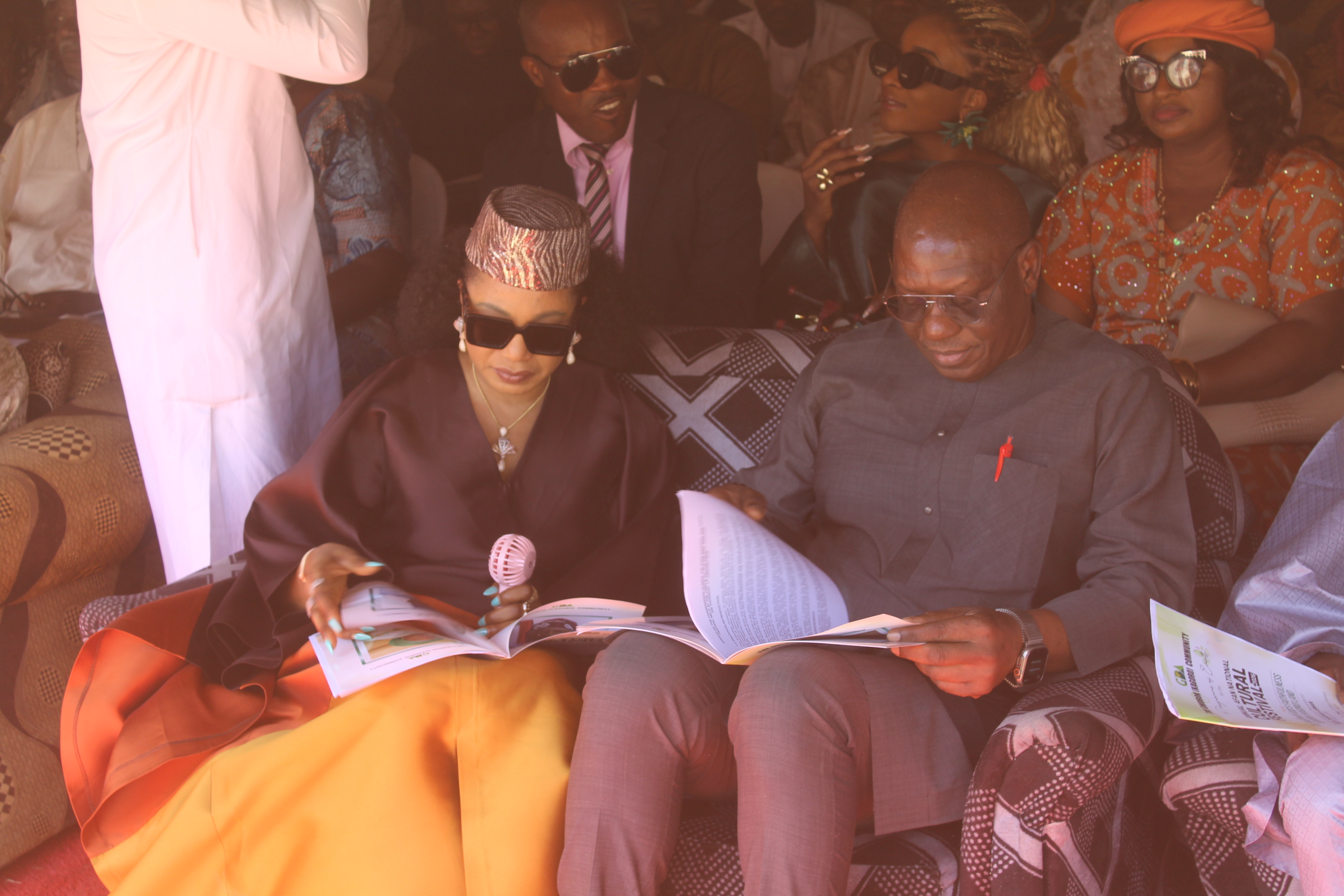
Abigail Marshall Katung and Marshall Katung

Katung is married to Nigerian lawyer and lawmaker, Sunday Marshall Katung. As of 2023, the couple has two 19-year-old twin sons whom she chose to bring up in Leeds.

In 2025, Marshall Katung became involved in a legal dispute over a £1 million mansion in Alwoodley, Leeds. According to the National Crime Agency (NCA), she paid a £400,000 deposit toward the property in 2015 using funds transferred from Nigeria through an informal value transfer system, which she described as a "parallel" or "black" market. The property was later seized by the NCA as part of a £10 million civil recovery agreement with a businessman suspected of money laundering. In 2025, the High Court ruled that Marshall Katung had no legal claim to the property, citing "telling omissions" in her evidence and concluding that she was not a reliable witness. The court also ordered her to pay damages and legal costs. The NCA clarified that there was no suggestion that she was aware of any alleged criminal conduct by the previous owner.
