= Ibrahim Khalid Mustapha =

Nigerian politician

Senator of the Federal Republic of Nigeria from Kaduna State North District
- Incumbent
- Assumed office 29 May 2023
- Preceded by: Suleiman Abdu Kwari

Personal details
- Born: Kaduna
- Party: People's Democratic Party

Ibrahim Khalid Mustapha is a Nigerian Politician and currently senator representing the Kaduna North Senatorial District, in the 10th Nigerian National Assembly. He defeated his opponent Sulaiman Abdu Kwari, after being elected in the 2023 Nigerian general election. He served as the member house of representatives representing Soba Federal Constituency from 2007-2015 for the 6th and 7th Assembly. He is a member of the African Democratic congress {ADC}.

== Primary Election ==
Mustapha won the PDP primary election with 257 votes, which makes him the official PDP candidate in the 2023 Nigerian general election.

== See also ==
- Kaduna North Senatorial District
