= Olukunle Bamgbose =

Nigerian career diplomat (born 1958)

Olukunle Akindele Bamgbose

Personal details
- Born: September 21, 1958 (age 67) Ilesha, Osun State, Nigeria
- Education: University of Nigeria, Nsukka
- Occupation: Diplomat, civil servant

Olukunle Akindele Bamgbose (born 21 September 1958) is a Nigerian career diplomat who served in the Ministry of Foreign Affairs from 1983 until his retirement in September 2018. He held the rank of Ambassador and served as Permanent Secretary of the Ministry of Foreign Affairs from 2017 to 2018.

== Early life and education ==
Bamgbose is from Ilesha West Local Government Area, Osun State. He attended African Church Grammar School, Ilesha, and Anwar-ul-Islam College, Agege, Lagos State. He obtained a B.A. in Mass Communication from the University of Nigeria, Nsukka in 1982.

== Career ==
Bamgbose was appointed to the Nigerian Foreign Service on 14 December 1983 as Third Secretary in the Public Relations and Cultural Department. He was subsequently posted to the Embassy of Nigeria in Mauritania (1987–1991), then served in the Protocol Division at headquarters (1991–1998).

From 2000 to 2005, he served as Minister Counsellor at Nigeria's Permanent representative to the United Nations in New York. He was posted as Minister to the Embassy of Nigeria in Tokyo from 2008 to 2012.

He served as Deputy High Commissioner at the High Commission of Nigeria, London from September 2014, and became Acting High Commissioner following the departure of High Commissioner Dalhatu Tafida in August 2015. In October 2015, Bamgbose disclosed to journalists that the UK Home Office had designated approximately 29,000 Nigerians for deportation, stating that Nigeria would require due process to be followed before accepting any returns.

On 10 November 2015, President Muhammadu Buhari appointed Bamgbose Permanent Secretary of the Political Affairs Office in the Office of the Secretary to the Government of the Federation (OSGF). In July 2018, he and fellow Permanent Secretary Aminu Nabegu were conferred with the Ambassadorial Title (In-Situ) by the Federal Government.

In August 2017, Bamgbose was redeployed as Permanent Secretary of the Ministry of Foreign Affairs.

Bamgbose retired in September 2018 after 35 years in the Foreign Service and was succeeded as Permanent Secretary by Mustapha Suleiman.
