= Kaduna North senatorial district =

Nigerian senatorial district in Kaduna State

Kaduna North senatorial district covers eight local government areas of Kaduna State including Ikara, Kubau, Kudan, Lere, Makarfi, Sabon Gari, Soba, and Zaria. Zaria is the district headquarters.

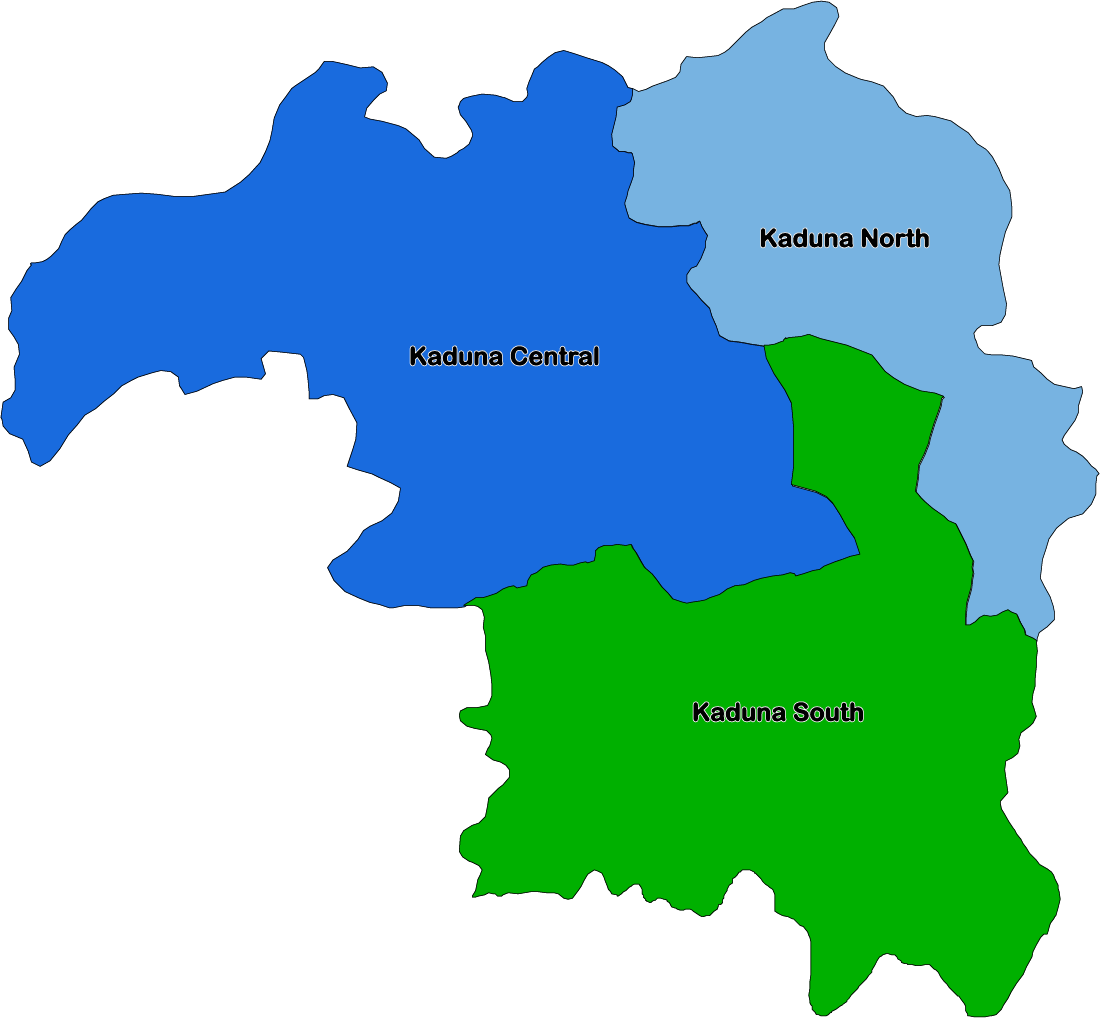
Kaduna North senatorial district coloured sky blue.

== List of senators representing Kaduna North ==
Image	Senator	Party	Year	Assembly
100x	Dalhatu Tafida	PDP	1999–2007	4th 5th
	Ahmed Makarfi	PDP	2007–2011	6th
	Yusuf Datti Baba-Ahmed	CPC	2011	7th
	Ahmed Makarfi	PDP	2011–2015	7th
	Suleiman Othman Hunkuyi	APC	2015–2019	8th
	Suleiman Abdu Kwari	APC	2019–2023	9th
	Khalid Mustapha	PDP	2023–present	10th

== See also ==
- Kaduna Central senatorial district
- Kaduna South senatorial district
