= Isaiah Balat =

Nigerian politician and businessman (1952–2014)

- Senator Isaiah Balat

Special adviser for special duties (office of the vice president of Nigeria)
- In office May 2010 – 18 February 2014
- President: Goodluck Jonathan
- Succeeded by: Vacant

Senator for Kaduna South Senatorial District
- In office 29 May 2003 – 29 May 2007
- Preceded by: Haruna Aziz Zeego
- Succeeded by: Caleb Zagi

Minister for Works and Housing (State)
- In office May 1999 – December 2000
- President: Olusegun Obasanjo

Personal details
- Born: 23 October 1952 Kaduna, Nigeria
- Died: 18 February 2014 (aged 61)
- Party: PDP
- Children: 5, including Bobai
- Education: Harvard Business School

Isaiah Chawai Balat (23 October 1952 – 18 February 2014) was a Nigerian politician and businessman from southern Kaduna State. He was the senator of the Federal Republic of Nigeria representing Kaduna South Senatorial District from May 2003 to May 2007 and, a member of the People's Democratic Party. Prior to his election to the Senate, he served as the minister of state for works and housing in the cabinet of President Olusegun Obasanjo from 1999 to 2000. In May 2010, Balat was appointed the special advisor to the president on special duties (office of the vice-president) where he served until his demise in 2014.

== Early life and education ==
Isaiah Chawai Balat was born on 23 October 1952 in Gora (Ka̠nai), a village in Zangon Kataf local government area of Kaduna State, Nigeria. His father was from Gora while his mother was from a village called Kamuru. He was born into a polygamous family which was very common at the time. Balat's mother died shortly after his birth. He spent his formative years in relative poverty, working on his father's farm rearing cattle.

He started his early education at SIM Primary School in Gora (Kanai) in 1959 and later moved to SIM Primary School Ungwar Tabo (Afabwang), where he completed his primary education. He subsequently went to the Commonwealth College of Commerce Jos in Plateau State between 1966 and 1970 for his secondary school education. After completing primary and post-primary education, Balat attended a sandwich programme in Marketing at the Kaduna Polytechnic between 1976 and 1978.

For his executive education, he attended the Advanced Management Program (AMP) at Harvard Business School in Boston, in 1991. Later, Balat undertook postgraduate courses in Petroleum Management at St. Clements University, in prospect, in addition to a certificate from the Oxford Princeton Programme (then known as the College of Petroleum and Energy Studies), Oxford, United Kingdom, between 1996 and 1998.

In 2004, Balat attended the Public Utility Research Centre/ World Bank Training Program on Utility Regulation and Strategy at the University of Florida, Florida, United States.

== Career and business ==
Isaiah Balat worked for BP plc (formerly The British Petroleum Company PLC., British Petroleum and BP Amoco PLC.) in Kano State before being transferred to their Kaduna branch in 1973. He was promoted to managerial level before leaving the company in 1978 to establish his own private oil and gas services company, Gora Nigeria Limited, of which he was the chairman and chief executive officer.

While in business, Balat established the CB Finance Group, a holding company with interests in oil and gas services, banking, insurance and agro-allied industries.

Balat held several high management appointments and positions in the private and public sectors. He was a member of the Kaduna State Urban Development Board (1979 1985), a member of the Plateau State Committee on Revenue Sources (1980 to 1982), the pioneer chairman of the Katsina Steel Rolling Mill from 1980 to 1983.

Balat also served as a member of the council, Industrial Training Fund from 1987 to 1994), chairman of the Kaduna State Distribution Agency from 1987 to 1992, chairman of the Kaduna State Industrial and Finance Company from 1994 to 1998 and a member of the board of Nigerian Coal Corporation from 1991 and 1994.

Balat was also the president of the Kaduna Chamber of Commerce, Industry, Mines and Agriculture from 1987 to 1991, during which period he initiated and commenced the construction of the Kaduna International Trade Fair Complex.

He was the vice-president, Nigerian Chamber of Commerce, Industry, Mines and Agriculture(NACCIMA) from 1985 to 1987, chairman of the British Council (Kaduna/Kano Floors) and a member of the National Council of the Nigerian Stock Exchange, from 1993 to 1996.

He served as a non-executive director of Guinness Nigeria from 1996 to 1999.

== Politics and appointments ==
=== Early political career ===
In 1978, Isaiah Balat was the chairman of the Nigerian People's Party (NPP) in Kaduna State where he led the coalition that ensured the election of Alhaji Abdulkadir Balarabe Musa as the first civilian governor of Kaduna State in the Second Republic of Nigeria.

After the termination of the Nigerian Second Republic, he went back to his private business. However, with the advent of party politics during the Gen. Ibrahim Badamasi Babangida’s administration, he joined the Social Democratic Party (SDP) where he was known for his close relationship with the SDP presidential candidate, Chief Moshood Kashimawo Olawale Abiola (MKO).

Balat continued his involvement in party politics and in 1998, Balat became the Kaduna State Coordinator of the Obasanjo Campaign Organizations.

=== Minister for works and housing (state) ===
In June 1999, Isaiah Balat was appointed Minister of State for Works and Housing in the cabinet of President Olusegun Obasanjo. As Minister of State for Works he discharged oversight duties and supervised projects of the Ministry which included but not limited to:

- The reconstruction of Kaduna - Kachia Gimi Road, Flagged up
- Reconstruction of Vom - Manchok Road Flagged up 1 February 2000
- Construction of Bridge over River Wonderful at Kafanchan 20 April 2000
- Rehabilitation of Saminaka - Samaru Kataf – Kafanchan Road 20 April 2000
- Provision of 132KV Transmission line from Jos to Kafanchan and construction of 2 x 60MVA, 132/33KV substation at Kafanchan

=== Senator of the 5th National Assembly ===
In 2003, Balat was overwhelmingly elected a senator of the Federal Republic of Nigeria representing Kaduna South Senatorial District of Kaduna State.

During his senatorial tenor, he was the chairman Senate Committee on Privatization for two consecutive years during which he led the Senate and House Committees on Privatisation on a study tour on ports reform to the USA and Mexico, where far reaching ideas on Ports Privatization and Management was acquired.

Aside from his work on advancing legislation on privatisation, he also served as the chairman, Senate Committee on Anti-corruption and where he worked to promoting bills advancing transparency in governance.

During his tenure, Balat also served as member of the Senate Appropriation and Finance Committee, Senate Committee on Defense and Senate Committee on Power and Steel.

=== Kaduna State 2007 Governorship Candidate ===
In 2007, Balat was a frontline candidate contesting for the Gubernatorial Primary of Kaduna State under the PDP, losing to Arc. Namadi Sambo in a run-off election.

For his Governorship Campaign in 2007, Balat used the term – "Wadata" which means "Stock" in Hausa language. The word became very popular during the campaign period and was used to signify a movement of change in the state.

=== 2010 Northern Political Summit Group ("The G-20") ===
Balat was instrumental in setting up the Northern Political Summit Group - The G-20 - which held in Kaduna on 16 and 17 March 2010.

The theme and the focus of the G-20 was to evolve an agenda for social and economic transformation of the North of Nigeria. It successfully attracted participation of a large number of the political, economic class, academia, professionals and technocrats across all sectors and parts of the country. Its conclusions and resolutions were incisive and far reaching, culminating in drawing up of a Northern Economic Blueprint.

=== Special adviser for special duties (office of the Vice President of Nigeria ===
In May 2010, Isaiah Balat was appointed the special adviser to the president on special duties (office of the vice-president) where he served till his demise.

Other committee memberships included the National Council on Privatization – Committee on Privatization of New Nigerian Newspaper and the National Council on Privatization’s ad-hoc committee on BPE tax liabilities.

== International work ==
Isaiah Balat participated in the United Nations organized colloquium preceding the South Commission Report under the chairmanship of the Late Dr. Julius Nyerere, former president of Tanzania, which examined and recommended modalities for bridging the gap in the standards of living of peoples in the Northern and Southern hemispheres.

Balat led Nigerian Trade Delegations to South Korea, the USA, the UK, Canada, Germany, Japan, Brazil, South Africa and Namibia to encourage investors in those countries to invest in the Nigerian economy.

== Philanthropy ==
In 2005, Balat established the Isaiah Balat Foundation, with the goal of vaccinating over a million people across Kaduna State against Meningitis.

Balat engaged in several benevolent empowerment projects. Through the Isaiah Balat Foundation, he provided free medical assistance to the poor, weak and vulnerable in the society, especially in rural communities. Balat sponsored and supported the education of less privileged children.

== Honours and awards ==
Isaiah Balat has earned many honors in recognition of his service to his community the state, country and internationally. In 1990 he was awarded the Gold medal of the Chamber Europeene Pour la Development Du Commerce fe I’Industrie et Finances, for the promotion of trade between Nigeria and the European Union. In 1991, he received the Kaduna State Students’ Merit Award for his contribution to the economy development of the State.

In 2000, Balat was awarded the International Trade and Development Award for promotion trade and investment between the United States and Nigeria by the Africa-USA Chamber of Commerce and Industry, Los Angeles, California, United States. In 2000 he was also made honorary life vice-president of the Nigerian Chamber of Commerce, Industry, Mines and Agriculture (NACCIMA). Balat was a Fellow of the prestigious Institute of Directors (UK).

== Death and legacy ==
He died on 18 February 2014 in Abuja after a brief illness. He was buried in Bafoi-Kanai, Kaduna State.
