= Caleb Zagi =

Nigerian politician and Lawyer

Senator Caleb Zagi

Senator for Kaduna South
- In office 29 May 2007 – May 29, 2011
- Preceded by: Isaiah Balat
- Succeeded by: Nenadi Usman

Personal details
- Born: October 1960 (age 65–66) Kaduna State, Nigeria
- Party: African Democratic Congress

Caleb Zagi (born October 1960) was elected Senator for Kaduna South Senatorial District of Kaduna State, Nigeria, taking office on 29 May 2007. He was a member of the People's Democratic Party (PDP).

Zagi obtained a master's degree in business administration. He was elected to the House Of Representatives in 2003, holding office until 2007. He won the PDP nomination as senatorial candidate for the southern zone of Kaduna, but in January 2007 came under intense pressure to hand over his ticket to the incumbent senator Isaiah Balat, and to run on the deputy governor's ticket of the party. Zagi refused to yield the ticket, and was elected.
