= Uba Sani =

Nigerian politician (born 1970)

His Excellency Uba Sani
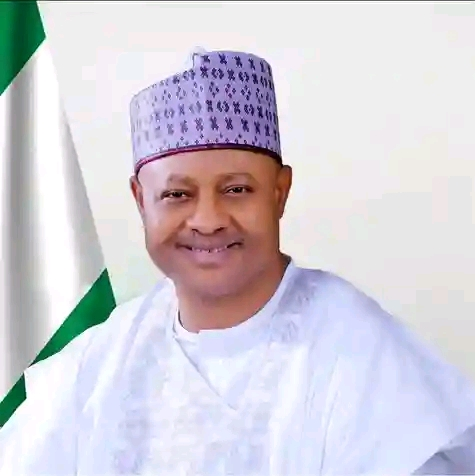

Governor of Kaduna State
- Incumbent
- Assumed office 29 May 2023
- Deputy: Hadiza Balarabe
- Preceded by: Nasir El-Rufai

Senator for Kaduna Central
- In office 11 June 2019 – 29 May 2023
- Preceded by: Shehu Sani
- Succeeded by: Lawal Adamu Usman

Personal details
- Born: 31 December 1970 (age 55) Zaria, North-Central State (now Kaduna State), Nigeria
- Party: All Progressives Congress
- Spouse: Hafsat Uba Sani
- Education: Kaduna Polytechnic; University of Abuja; University of Calabar
- Occupation: Politician; engineer
- Website: ubasani.org

Uba Sani (born 31 December 1970) is a Nigerian engineer and politician who has served as Governor of Kaduna State since 2023. He previously served as the Senator representing Kaduna central senatorial district from 2019 to 2023.

== Career ==
Uba Sani went into politics after the return of democracy in Nigeria in 1999, and supported the People's Democratic Party Presidential candidate, Chief Olusegun Obasanjo. After winning the presidential election, Uba Sani was appointed Special Adviser on public affairs to the President. He also worked at the Federal Capital Territory Administration (FCTA) on some advisory roles to the then FCT Minister, Nasir Ahmad El-Rufai and the Kaduna State Ministry of Housing and Works. In 2011. Uba Sani contested in the People's Democratic Party primaries for the Kaduna Central Senatorial seat but he lost the primaries, and in 2015, he was appointed by the Kaduna State Governor Nasir Ahmad el-Rufai as the Special Adviser, political and intergovernmental affairs. However, in 2019, Uba Sani showed interest and contested the second time for the Kaduna Central senatorial seat under the ruling political party, All Progressives Congress (APC), and was elected senator during the February 2019 Nigeria general elections. In 2022, Sani picked APC nomination forms for 2023 governorship election in Kaduna State.

Uba Sani founded the Uba Sani Foundation in 2018. The foundation's mission is to promote increased access to good healthcare services, education and improved livelihood for the underprivileged in Nigeria.

== Education ==
Uba Sani is a Mechanical Engineer by training. He holds a Master of Science degree in Finance from the University of Calabar and a Post-Graduate Diploma in Business Administration from the University of Abuja.

== 2023 election primaries ==
Uba Sani emerged as the All Progressives Congress Governorship candidate in Kaduna State for the 2023 elections. He was listed as the candidate against Sani Sha'aban and Bashir Abubakar to win the primaries. Uba Sani was believed to be El-Rufai's anointed candidate.

== Kaduna Gubernatorial Elections ==
Uba Sani won the 2023 Kaduna State Gubernatorial election with a total of 730,002 votes to defeat his closest rival, Isa Ashiru of the Peoples Democratic Party (PDP), who polled 719,196 votes.
