= Sunday Marshall Katung =

Nigerian politician and lawyer (born 1961)

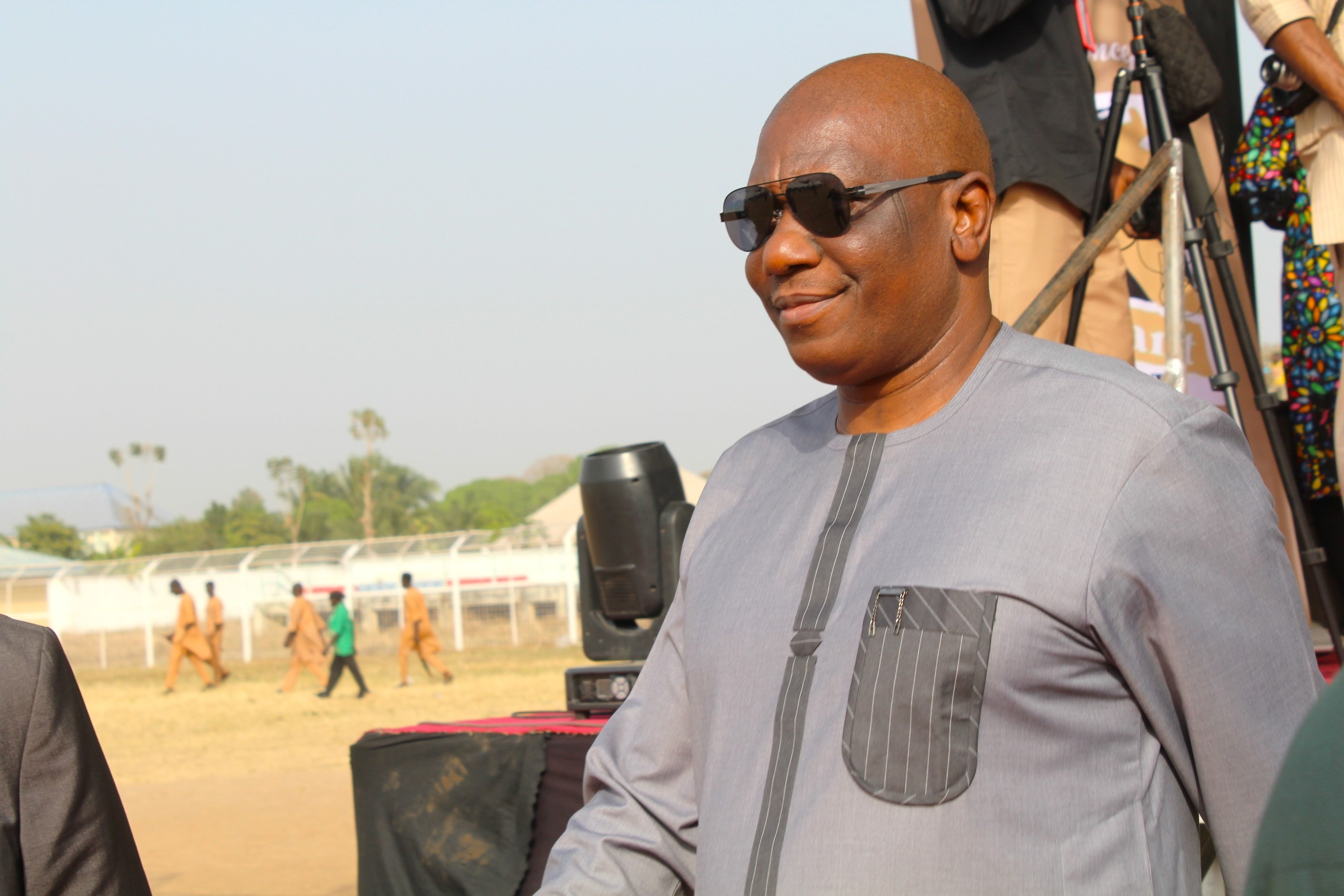
- Katung in December 2024

Senator for Kaduna South
- Incumbent
- Assumed office 13 June 2023
- Preceded by: Danjuma Laah

Member of the House of Representatives of Nigeria from Kaduna
- In office 9 June 2015 – 9 June 2019
- Constituency: Jaba/Zangon Kataf

Personal details
- Born: 1 April 1961 (age 65) Madakiya, Northern Region, Nigeria (now in Kaduna State)
- Party: Peoples Democratic Party
- Spouse: Abigail Marshall Katung
- Children: 2
- Education: University of Lagos (BA); Ahmadu Bello University (MA)
- Occupation: Politician; lawyer
- Website: SMK

Sunday Marshall Katung (born 1 April 1961) is a Nigerian politician and lawyer who has served as the Senator Representing Kaduna South Senatorial District since 2023. He was a member of the House of Representatives of Nigeria representing Jaba/Zangon Kataf Federal constituency of Kaduna State. He is currently the vice chairman, Senate committee on Ecology and Climate change.

== Early life and education ==
Katung was born on 1 April 1961, in Madakiya, defunct Northern Region (now in Zangon Kataf LGA of southern Kaduna State), Nigeria. He attended Kufena College, Wusasa Zaria from 1975 to 1980; then proceeded to the College of Arts & Science, Zaria, from 1980 to 1982. He afterwards attended the University of Lagos, Akoka, from 1982 to 1986 and the Nigerian Law School, Victoria Island, Lagos from 1986 to 1987. He obtained a Post-Graduate Diploma in Management (PGDM) in 2000 and a Master's degree in Business Administration (MBA) from Ahmadu Bello University, Zaria, in 2005. He then got an Advanced Diploma certificate in Legal Drafting and Conveyancing at the Institute of Advanced Legal Studies, Akoka, Lagos. Among the several courses he attended are course on: Public Enterprise Restructuring at the International Law Institute, Washington DC, United States; Post-privatisation – Managing the Challenge in the same institution; Company Secretaries and Corporate Legal Adviser's Course at the Management School, London, UK; National Seminar on Company Law and Practice and Corporate Administration by AMIT Consultancy services LTD; Negotiation of International Contracts by POTOMAC WORKSHOPS; Legal and Financial Aspects of Pension Scheme and Trust Management by Lord SALISBURY CHAMBERS AND LIBRARY. As of 2018, was undergoing a PhD program at Ahmadu Bello University, Zaria.

== Career ==
Katung served as:

- Commissioner of Water Resources; and of Finance, Kaduna State. (July 2010 - May 2011).
- Served as Company Secretary/Legal Adviser to Nigeria Reinsurance Corporation.
- As of 2020, a solicitor of the Supreme Court of Nigeria.

=== Politics ===
==== House of representatives seat ====
Katung contested under the party flagship of the PDP in 2015 and got elected as a member of Federal House of Representatives, representing Jaba/Zangon Kataf Federal constituency of Kaduna State.

His moral principles while still in serving in the Federal House of Representatives had been:

"A free market economy with a social conscience, family values, community empowerment and human rights in a federal system."

==== Deputy governorship race ====
In 2018, he emerged as the deputy governorship candidate for the People's Democratic Party (PDP) Kaduna State governorship aspirant, Hon. Isah Ashiru.

==== Senatorial seat ====
In May 2022, Katung polled 112 out of a total of 269 votes to beat incumbent Senator, Danjuma Laah, who polled 74 votes in the PDP primary election.

In the 25 February 2023, senatorial elections, Katung polled a total of 138,246 votes, defeating closest opponent Michael Auta of the Labour Party who scored 101,479 votes. Hence, replacing the incumbent to represent the Kaduna South Senatorial District. Shortly after his inauguration into the Senate, he was made the Vice chairman Senate committee on Ecology and Climate change.

== Key Achievements as the Vice chairman Senate Committee on Ecology and Climate Change ==
- In February 2024, Katung proposed the establishment of a dedicated Tertiary Research Trust Fund to provide grants to researchers focusing on environmental degradation and climate change mitigation. This initiative aims to boost academic and scientific efforts in addressing ecological challenges, such as desertification and flooding in Kaduna State and beyond
- In September 2024, at the International Forum on African-Caribbean Leadership during the UN General Assembly in New York, Katung delivered a keynote speech urging unified African and Caribbean efforts to tackle climate challenges. He emphasized shared vulnerabilities like rising sea levels and extreme weather, positioning the Senate Committee as a bridge for bilateral knowledge exchange.

== Awards and Recognitions ==
- African Leadership Legislative Excellence Award from the African Leadership Magazine on September 4, 2024

== Personal life ==
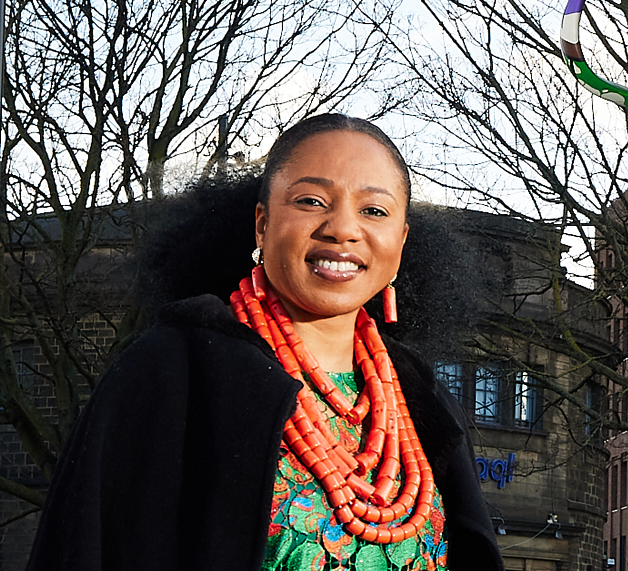
Cllr Abigail Marshall-Katung near Hibiscus Rising, LEEDS 2023

Katung married Nigerian-British Councillor Abigail Marshall Katung, who as of January 2024 is the Lord mayor of Leeds. The couple have two 19 year-old twin sons (from her previous marriage).
