= Mohammed Kabiru Jibril =

Nigerian senator (1958–2017)

Senator of the Federal Republic of Nigeria
- In office May 2007 – May 2011
- Preceded by: Mohammed Aruwa
- Succeeded by: Mohammed Saleh
- Constituency: Kaduna Central

Personal details
- Born: 18 May 1958 Zaria, Northern Region, British Nigeria (now in Kaduna State, Nigeria)
- Died: 19 September 2017 (aged 59) Abuja, Nigeria
- Party: People's Democratic Party (PDP)
- Children: Hafsat, Mohammad Tajudeen, Najah, Ummul Khair.
- Education: Ahmadu Bello University
- Occupation: Lawyer, Politician and Humanitarian

Mohammed Kabiru Jibril (18 May 1958 – 19 September 2017) was a Nigerian senator who was elected under the People's Democratic Party (PDP) to represent the Kaduna Central Senatorial District of Kaduna State in April 2007.

== Background ==
Mohammed Kabiru Jibril was born on 18 May 1958. He has an LL.B from Ahmadu Bello University -1984, Nigerian Law School-1985. Prior to his election to the senate, he was the National Legal Advisor and National Secretary, North-West Zone for the Peoples Democratic Party (PDP).

== Senate career ==
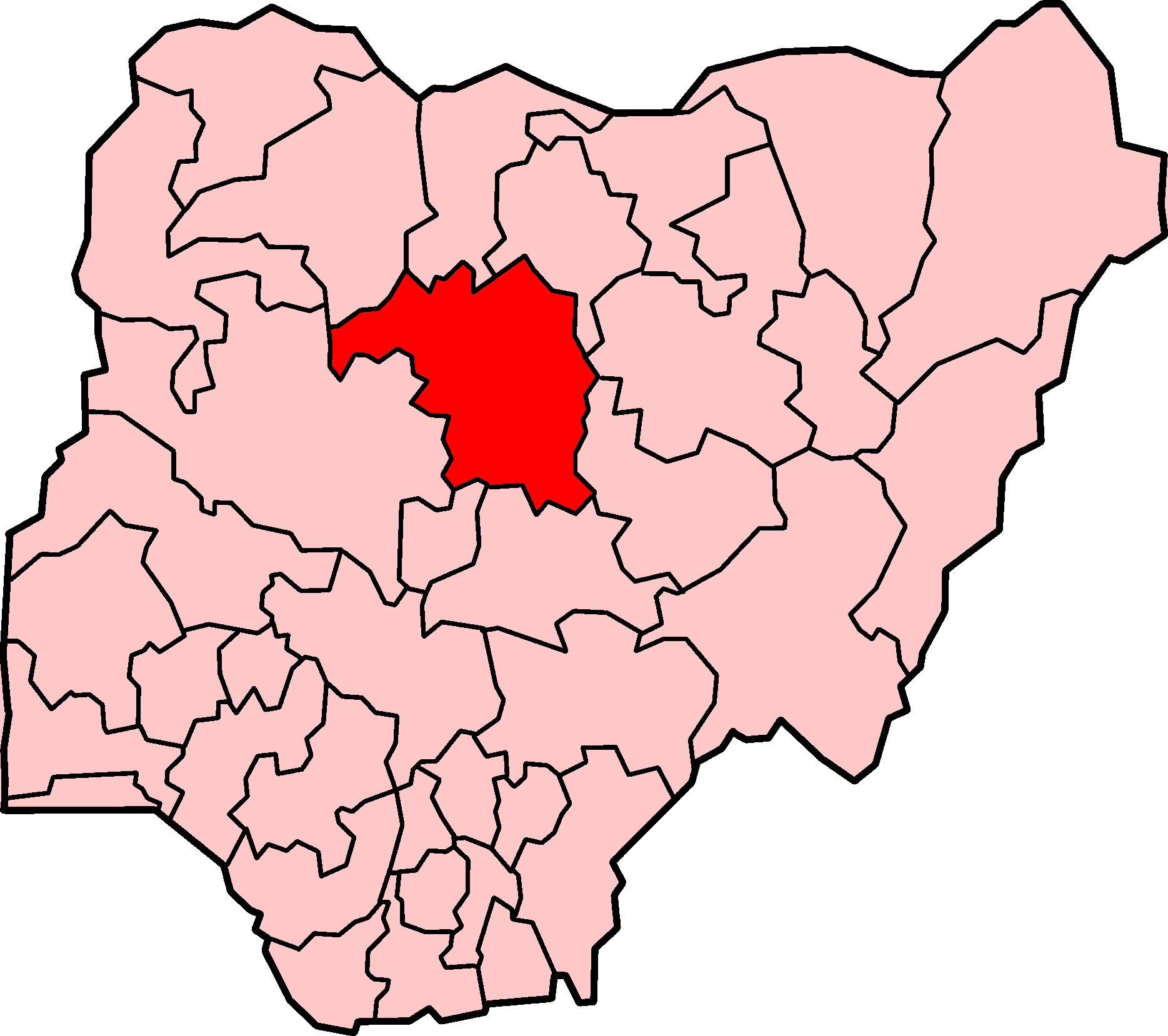
Kaduna State in Nigeria

Mohammed Kabiru Jibril was elected to the National Senate for the Kaduna Central constituency in 2007 and was appointed to committees on Solid Minerals, Security & Intelligence, Police Affairs, Interior Affairs, Gas and Air Force.

In May 2009, Emmanuel Egboga, special adviser on petroleum to President Umaru Yar'Adua alleged that some senators and labor union leaders may have been bribed on a trip to Ghana to frustrate effort to reform the oil and gas sector . The senate directed its ethics committee to hold a public hearing to investigate the allegation. Senators named by Egboga included Mohammed Kabiru Jibril but was later found clean.

In July 2009 the Nigerian Senate unanimously passed a bill to establish the National Climate Change Commission, sponsored by Senator Jibril. Other bills that Kabiru Jabril sponsored or co-sponsored include National Inland Waterways Authority, Nigeria Police Equipment Commission (Amendment), Legal Practitioners Act (Amendment) 2009, Police Act (Repeal and Re-enactment) 2009, Prison Service Act Repeal and Re-enactment 2009 and Criminal Justice Act (Amendment).

== Death ==
He died on 19 September 2017 at the age of 59.
