= Kaduna Central senatorial district =

Nigerian senatorial district in Kaduna State

Kaduna Central senatorial district covers seven local government areas of Kaduna State including Birnin Gwari, Chikun, Giwa, Igabi, Kaduna North, Kaduna South, and Kajuru. Kaduna is the district headquarters.

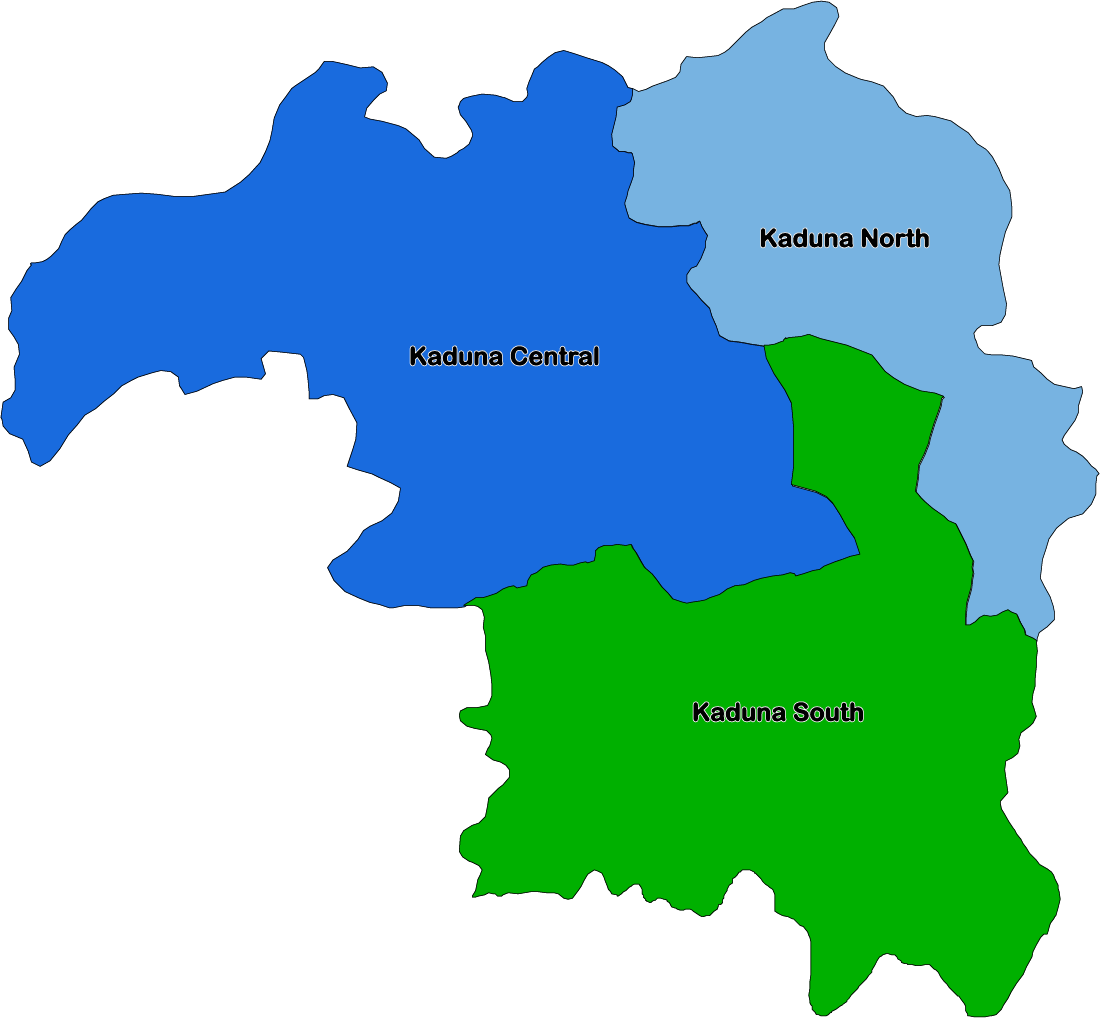
Kaduna Central senatorial district coloured dark blue.

== List of senators representing Kaduna Central ==
Image	Senator	Party	Year	Assembly
	Mohammed Aruwa	APP; ANPP	1999–2007	4th 5th
	Mohammed Kabiru Jibril	PDP	2007–2011	6th
	Mohammed Sani Saleh	CPC	2011–2015	7th
	Shehu Sani	APC	2015–2019	8th
	Uba Sani	APC	2019–2023	9th
	Lawal Adamu Usman	PDP	2023–present	10th

== See also ==
- Kaduna North senatorial district
- Kaduna South senatorial district
