= Tudun Wada =

The concept of a Tudun Wada section of cities and towns in Northern Nigeria, South Central Niger and Northern Cameroon is a common one, as a neighborhood inhabited by people from other parts of Hausaland. This is similar to towns and cities having a section named Sabon Gari.

It may also refer to one of several towns/villages or local government areas in Nigeria:

- Tudun Wada (Kano state)
- Tudun Wada (Kaduna State)
- A district south of Zaria
- A suburb south of Lafia
