= Muhammad Sani Ibrahim =

Nigerian politician

Member of the House of Representatives
- In office 2003–2007
- Constituency: Kaduna North Federal Constituency

Personal details
- Born: October 1970 (age 55) Kaduna State, Nigeria
- Party: All Nigeria Peoples Party (ANPP)
- Occupation: Politician

Muhammad Sani Ibrahim is a Nigerian politician who served as a representative of the Kaduna North Federal Constituency in the 5th National Assembly from 2003 to 2007. He was a member of the All Nigeria Peoples Party (ANPP). He holds a Graduate Diploma in International Relations and Diplomacy from Kaduna Polytechnic, Kaduna.
