= Badarawa, Kaduna =

Town in Kaduna State, Nigeria

Badarawa
- Town in Kaduna North

- Location in Nigeria
- Coordinates: 10°55′N 7°44′E
- Country: Nigeria
- State: Kaduna State

Population (2010)
  - Total: 27,206
- Time zone: UTC+1 (WAT)

Badarawa is an area located in Kaduna city under Kaduna North local government area. it was bordered by Unguwan Sarki, Unguwan Dosa, Malali and Nigerian Defence Academy, Kaduna.

== Geographical locations ==
It consists of some small towns which are: Kwaru(Kwaru majalisa and kwarun Ajilo), Malali(Malali Village and also Malali G.R.A) Majalisa, Unguwan Yero, Unguwan Shekara, Unguwan Gado and Unguwan mai samari. The whole of Badarawa is subdivided into two: Badarawa village and Badarawa G.R.A.

== Government and rulers ==
It has only two leaders, a traditional ruler called Mai-Anguwa or Head of district also known as Sarkin Badarawa and an Electoral leader called Councillor.

== Health and education ==
The town has L.E.A government primary school called L.E.A Badarawa where people of the place study Western education. They also have a primary health care.

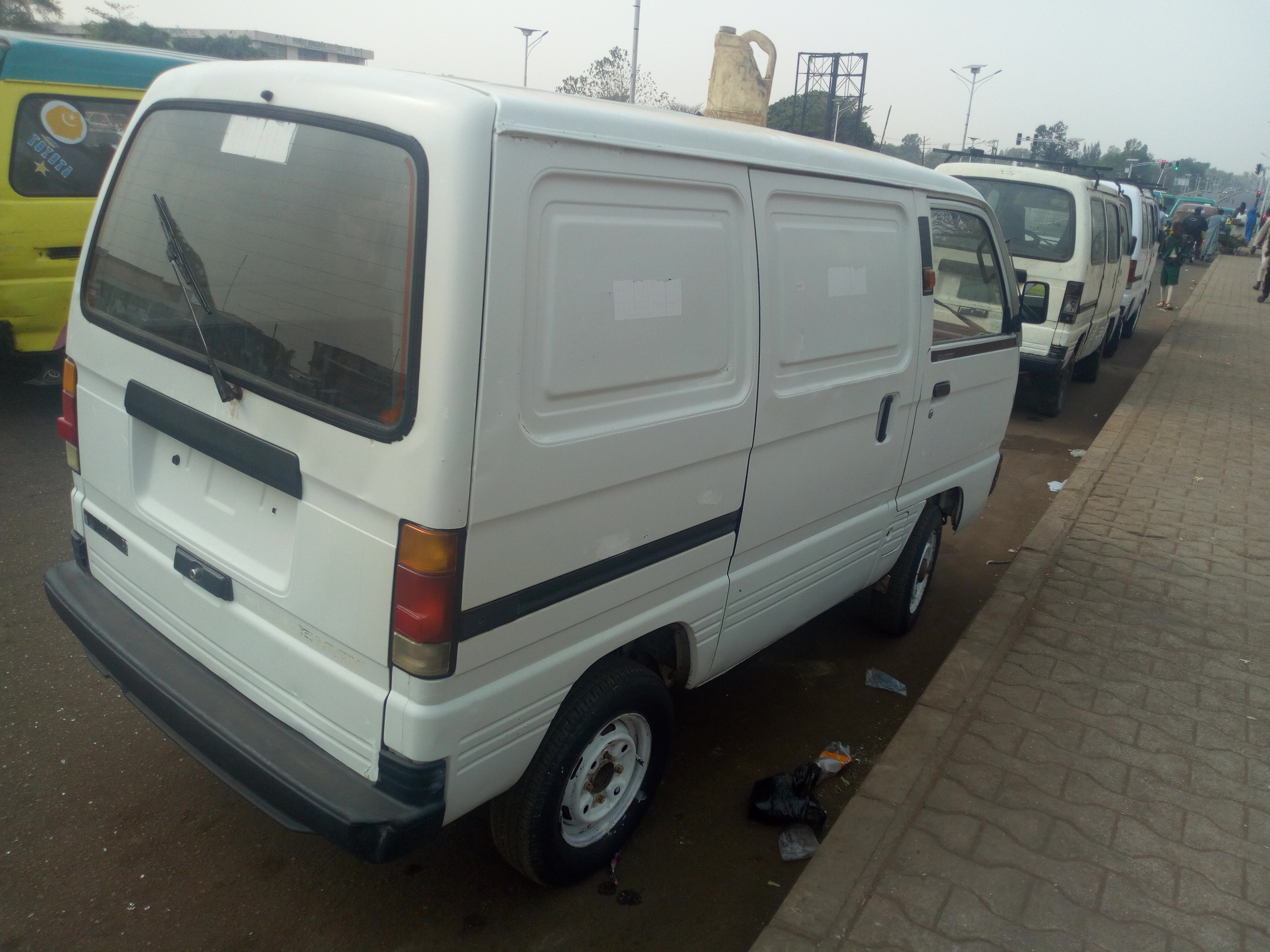
A bus at Badarawa bustop Kaduna.

== Notable people ==
- Rtd General late Alh:Mohammed Inuwa Wushishi
