= Muhammad Sani Abdullahi =

Nigerian international development expert and public servant

Deputy Governor, Central Bank of Nigeria
- In office October, 2023 – To date

Kaduna State Commissioner for Budget and Planning
- In office May 2015 – January 2019

Personal details
- Born: 26 October 1979 (age 46) Kaduna State, Nigeria
- Party: All Progressives Congress (APC)
- Education: University of Manchester (MSc); Ahmadu Bello University (MSc); London School of Economics (Public Finance)
- Occupation: Development Economist, Public Servant, Politician

Muhammad Sani Abdullahi popularly known as Dattijo is a Deputy Governor of Economic Policy at the Central Bank of Nigeria. President Bola Ahmed Tinubu appointed Muhammad as Deputy Governor on 15 September 2023. Dattijo served as a policy adviser at the Executive Office of United Nations Secretary General Ban Ki Moon in New York. Dattijo formed the core team that developed the Sustainable Development Goals (SDGs). Dattijo resigned from this appointment to serve the Nigerian government as the Commissioner for Budget and Planning in Kaduna State. He published a book titled "Disruption Rethinking Governance to work for the Poor." On 2 July 2023.

== Early life ==
Sani Abdullahi obtained his master's degree in Development Economics and Policy from the University of Manchester and obtained a second Masters from Ahmadu Bello University where he studied International Affairs and Diplomacy. He obtained certificates including in Public Finance at the London School of Economics; Sustainable Development at Columbia University and Advanced Project Management at Oxford University. He was part of the 2017 cohort of Georgetown University's Leadership Seminar.

== Career ==
Before his appointment as Commissioner in Kaduna State, Abdullahi worked closely with Secretary Ban and UN Deputy Secretary General, Amina Mohammed. The two share a close mentor-mentee relationship. Earlier he worked as an Economist and Deputy National Program Manager for the Millennium Development Goals at the Nigerian Presidency. He served as Economic Adviser of the Nigeria Governor's Forum after the MDGs. In 2018 he was one of two Nigerians - himself and Sahara Group co-founder, Tonye Cole - appointed to the World Bank Expert Advisory Council on Citizen Engagement.

=== Public speaking ===
Abdullahi is a TEDx speaker. He gave a TED talk "As you travel along life, remember..." at TEDxAhmaduBello University in 2018. In 2017, he gave a speech titled "The Cost and Privileges of Public Services" at TEDx Gamji. also at TEDxKangiwa which took place at the Local Government Service Commission, Katsina State in 2021. Was a speaker at the event, talked about a Resilient Northern Nigeria within a Brave New Nigeria.

=== Accomplishments ===
Abdullahi was a member of the UN Secretary-General's team that designed the Sustainable Development Goals (SDGs). As Commissioner of Budget and Planning in Kaduna, he conducted an in-depth analysis of the local SDGs data to advance implementation of the goals. According to the United Nations, "Kaduna State, Nigeria, is one of the first subnational governments in the world" to have done so. He ensured that Kaduna was the first state in Nigeria to subscribe to the Open Government Partnership. The ministry under Abdullahi ensured that Kaduna state consistently presented and delivered budgets ahead of time, making it the first state to present its budget to the state legislature.

==== Fellowships ====
In 2017, Abdullahi was selected as a fellow of the African Leadership Institute - West Africa, a collaborate initiative with the Aspen Global Leadership Network. In 2011, he was involved with the institute as an Archbishop Desmond Tutu fellow.

== Political involvement ==
Abdullahi was involved with the All Progressives Congress Kaduna transition committee in 2015. In 2018 he was appointed as a member of the Kaduna Central campaign directorate for the reelection of Governor Nasir El Rufai.
