= Nenadi Usman =

Nigerian politician (born 1966)

National Chairman of the Labour Party
- Incumbent
- Assumed office 2026
- Preceded by: Julius Abure

Senator of the Federal Republic of Nigeria from Kaduna South Senatorial District of Kaduna State
- In office 29 May 2011 – 29 May 2015
- Preceded by: Caleb Zagi
- Succeeded by: Danjuma Laah

Finance Minister of Nigeria
- In office July 2006 – May 2007
- Preceded by: Ngozi Okonjo-Iweala
- Succeeded by: Shamsuddeen Usman

Personal details
- Born: 12 November 1966 (age 59)
- Party: Labour Party (LP)
- Education: Ahmadu Bello University; University of Jos

Nenadi Esther Usman (born 12 November 1966) is a Nigerian politician who has served as the National Chairman of the Labour Party since 2026. A former Minister of Finance, she was elected senator of the Federal Republic of Nigeria representing the Kaduna South Senatorial District in the April 2011 elections, running on the People's Democratic Party (PDP) platform.

== Early career ==
Usman began her education in Jos, then later Kagoro, after which she attended the Federal Government College, Jos, Plateau State. She later acquired her first degree in Geography at Ahmadu Bello University, Zaria, and later a postgraduate diploma from the University of Jos. She was the managing director of Dana Ventures and then later executive adviser in Kaduna State in 1992. She was also the executive adviser in 1993 and then the principal personnel officer FCDA from 1994 to 1998.

Usman has played a major role in women's empowerment as she had a pivotal role in the formation of an NGO called "Education and Empowerment for Women" with its headquarters at Jere in Kaduna State and she is the present chairperson of the Coalition of N.G.O's for Women Development in Kaduna State. She is married with four children.

== Political career ==
She has served as a member Kaduna State caucus of the defunct National Republican Convention (NRC). She was also a member-elect of the House of Representatives, representing the Kachia/Kagarko Federal Constituency under the United Nigeria Congress Party in 1998. She was appointed commissioner in Kaduna State from 1999 to 2002, then commissioner for the environment & natural resources in the state in 2002, and later commissioner for health from 2002 to 2003.

She was the coordinator Alh. Ahmed Makarfi Campaign team in 1999 and she was re-elected campaign committee chairman in 2003. She was the coordinator of Kaduna State Chief Olusegun Obasanjo Campaign Committee.

She was appointed the minister of state for finance and later the minister of finance by the Obasanjo administration.

She was elected senator for Kaduna South in the April 2011 elections, running on the People's Democratic Party (PDP) platform. The Action Congress of Nigeria (ACN) disputed the result. As a senator of the Federal Republic of Nigeria, she has pushed for the government to give more attention to women and children, whom she calls the most vulnerable members of society.

== Personal life ==
Nenadi was married to HRH Dr. Sa'ad Usman, the Emir of Jere in Kaduna state who died in March 2020 at the age of 70, after suffering from a spinal cord problem.
