= Lawal Adamu Usman =

Nigerian politician

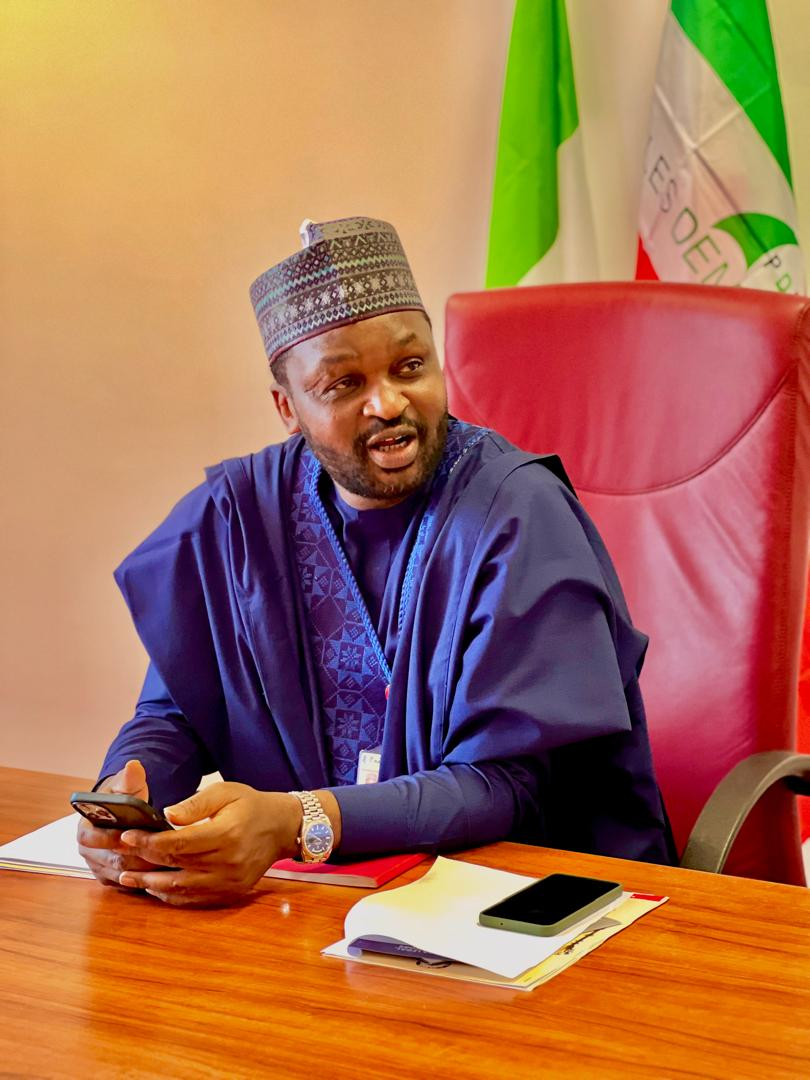

Senator of the Federal Republic of Nigeria from Kaduna State Central District
- Incumbent
- Assumed office 29 May 2023
- Preceded by: Uba Sani

Personal details
- Born: Kaduna
- Party: People's Democratic Party

Lawal Adamu Usman, commonly known as Mr. LAA, is a Nigerian politician who currently serves as a senator representing the Kaduna Central Senatorial District in the 10th Nigerian National Assembly. He emerged as the senator-elect after the 2023 Nigerian general election, running on the platform of the People's Democratic party (PDP) with 250,066 votes. Mr. La defeated APC candidate, Muhammad Sani Abdullahi (popularly known as Dattijo).

Mr. La's journey to the Senate began in the 2019 Nigeria general election when he initially contested for the same position. However, but he didn't succeed and his opponent Uba Sani, who eventually emerged victorious in that election. Mr. La remained committed to his political aspirations. In the 2023 Nigerian general election, Mr La re-contested, where he emerged as the winner according to the official results released by INEC. In 2025, he escaped an assassination attempt.

== Early life and education ==
Lawal Adamu Usman was born in Nigeria and hails from Kaduna State. He is a prominent political figure, philanthropist, and successful businessman. Senator Lawal Adamu's educational background is rooted in public administration, which he studied at Ahmadu Bello University, Zaria. He obtained a Bachelor of Science in Public Administration in 2018, after completing an Advanced Diploma and Diploma in the same field. He furthered his academic pursuits with a Masters in International Affairs and Diplomacy at the same institution in 2021.

His primary and secondary education were completed at Demonstration Primary School, Gwagwalada, and Diamond Academy in Zaria, respectively.

== Philanthropy and Social Advocacy ==
Senator Lawal Adamu Usman is known for his philanthropic efforts, which are central to his public persona. His charity work is carried out through the LA Cares Foundation, which he founded to provide support to vulnerable populations, particularly the youth, orphans, widows, and the less privileged.

Senator Usman is also a vocal advocate for social welfare reform. He criticized the Kaduna State Government’s drastic hike in tuition fees in 2020, arguing that it was a hardship for the poor and lacked compassion. To counter this, he launched a fund to assist families and students affected by the fee increase.

== See also ==
- Kaduna Central Senatorial District
