= Shehu Sani =

Nigerian politician, author and human rights activist

Senator for Kaduna Central
- In office June 2015 – June 2019
- Preceded by: Mohammed Saleh
- Succeeded by: Uba Sani

Personal details
- Born: 29 October 1967 (age 58) Tudun Wada Kaduna South, Kaduna State, Nigeria
- Party: People's Redemption Party - (PRP)
- Education: Kaduna Polytechnic
- Profession: Agricultural engineer, civil rights activist, author, publisher, poet, politician
- Nickname(s): Comrade, Kwamred, Revolutionary, Mai-Gashi

Shehu Sani (born 29 October 1967) is a Nigerian senator, an author, playwright and a human rights activist. He is the President of the Civil Rights Congress of Nigeria - (CRCN). and was the Chairman of Hand-in-Hand, Africa. He was a leading figure in the struggle for the restoration of democracy in Nigeria. He has been arrested and jailed by successive past military regimes in Nigeria. He was released from life imprisonment when democracy was restored in Nigeria in 1999. He contested and won the Kaduna Central Senatorial District on the platform of the All Progressive Congress on 28 March 2015.

== Early life ==
Sani was born on the 29th of October, 1967 in Tudun Wada, Kaduna. He had his primary school at the Local Government Education Authority (LGEA), Badarawa Kaduna between 1975 and 1980. He enrolled at the Government Day Secondary school, Kagara, Niger State, from 1980 to 1984, and proceeded to Government Science College School, Kagara, Niger State. He went to the Kaduna Polytechnic from 1984 to 1993 where he earned an associate degree in Agricultural Engineering.

== Unionism and activism ==
During his school days at the Kaduna Polytechnic, he was a student union activist. He served as the Chairman, Central Mobilization Committee of PAN-African Student Organization and President African Democratic Youth Congress. He also served as social Director Kaduna State Students Union. Sani came from a Nigerian middle-class family. His father was a production manager. He trained in the UK and Germany, and worked with the pro-Northern New Nigerian Newspaper for 30 years. Before that he worked as a printer with the Kano-based Daily Mail. He was also the government printer for Sokoto State from 1976 to 1979.

His father had a well-stocked library where Sani advanced his studies through literary knowledge and was especially influenced on books propounding the ideals of socialism and politics of the left; this being a period of massive inflow of literature from Eastern Europe. The exposure to books helped shaped his thoughts and leftist perception of life, as well as exposing him to the reality and decadence brought to the society by military dictatorship. Sani was equally influenced by his mother, who was a community women's leader; and the likes of Aminu Kano and the Northern Elements Progressive Union (NEPU) and PRP (Peoples Redemption party) radical politics.

From Kaduna Polytechnic, Sani plunged into national activism. He was introduced into the Campaign for Democracy (CD), Nigeria's umbrella pro-democracy group by activists like Femi Falana and Beko Ransome-Kuti and thereafter served as the Northern Coordinator and National Vice-Chairman of the group.

He was first detained in July 1993 under the regime of General Babagida. His offences then was that he advocated for the revalidation of the result of 12 June 1993 Presidential election polls won by the Late Chief M. K. O. Abiola. Sani was charged at a magistrate court, Ibrahim Taiwo Road, Kaduna, for sedition. During the interim government of Earnest Shonekan, Sani was arrested and detained for two weeks and later charged to court for sedition again. During General Sani Abacha's regime, he was implicated in the 1995 phantom coup and subsequently jailed for life in prison and later commuted to 15 years by the Patrick Aziza Special Military Tribunal that convicted the likes of General Olusegun Obasanjo (later President), Col. Lawan Gwadabe (rtd) and Chris Anyanwu and other journalists; his charges were: "Accessory to the fact of treason and managing an unlawful society (the Campaign for Democracy)". He was detained in various prisons: Kirikiri, Kaduna, Port-Harcourt, Enugu and Aba.

Before his several incarcerations, Sani co-founded the Movement for Unity and Progress and teamed up with other northern progressives such as Abubakar Dangiwa Umar, Bala Usman, James Bawa Magaji and Balarabe Musa, to fight for the actualization of 12 June annulled presidential election and other causes.

Sani is renowned for providing human rights campaign support to the poor and the disadvantage and in the process had clashed with security agents and other state power-wielders.

During the religious riots in Kaduna in 2000, he was the only human right activist in Kaduna that came out in the heat of the violence to condemn the massacre. In 2005, he was appointed to reshape the civil society in the national conference. Tradition rulers in the conference asked that Shehu Sani be barred from further speaking when he asked for their dissolution because of their pliant support for military dictator in the past. The chairman of the commission, Justice Niki Tobi turned down the call. During the riot in Kaduna, he pioneered the distribution of relief materials and initiated the visit to the "war zone" at the time when it was the most suicidal thing to contemplate.

Sani has organized and led protests:

- Against Iraq invasion of the state of Kuwait
- Against the Israeli war on Gaza in 2008
- Against the visit of George Bush and Tony Blair to Nigeria in March 2010
- Against Israeli raid on Gaza land flotilla in June 2011
- Against the Congolese Government on the detention of two Norwegian, Joshua French and Tjostolv Moland
- Against the removal of petroleum subsidy
- He took his activism to a greater dimension with more emphasis on Peace activism.
- He authored books on Peace. He organized rally and Bicycle race to promote peace.
- He instituted the Shehu Sani Annual Prize (2013) for Community Peace Advocates and publishes "Peace" newspaper.
- In an effort to contribute to addressing the challenges of insecurity in Nigeria, Sani facilitated the meeting of former President Olusegun Obasanjo to the family of slain Boko Haram Leader Muhammed Yusuf in 2011; His initiative ignited a debate and dialogue.
- In 2013, he was appointed by President Goodluck Jonathan into a Federal Government National Committee to Dialogue with the Boko Haram insurgency, he turned down the offer on the ground that his previous recommendation was not used.

== National assignment ==
Under President Olusegun Obasanjo's administration Sani was appointed as a member of the African Union African Peer Review Mechanism, Member of the United Nation Reform Committee, appointed by Nigerian President as a Member of the Presidential Committee on Prison Reforms, Presidential Committee on the Control of Violent Crimes and Illegal Weapons, Presidential Committee on Petroleum Products Prices, Presidential Committee on Conflict Resolution, Member of the Niger State Judicial Commission of Inquiry, Member of the National Political Reform Conference, Member of the Charles Taylor Investigation Committee, also appointed by the Nigerian Government as a Board Member of the Nigerian Extractive Industry Transparency Initiative (NEITI). Sani was a Member of the Presidential Committee on National Security and Civic Responsibility.

== Writing ==
Sani has many literary works to his credit, including:

Books

- Killing Fields, 2007
- Poverty in Northern Nigeria
- Political Assassination in Nigeria, 2007
- Youth as vanguard in the Battle against corruption
- Scorpion under pillow, 2007
- Civilian dictators of Africa, 2008
- Always wrong, can Yar’adua get it right, 2009
- Betrayal and Society, 2009
- The Children of Kaduna, 2011
- The Children of Jos, 2011
- Protest and Freedom, 2012
- Rebellious ideas, 2013
- Nigeria and Ethiopia: An analysis of historical ties, 2013
- Hatred for Black People, 2013

Plays

- Phantom Crescent, 2009
- Thugs at the Helm

Poetry

- Prison anthology, 2007
- The poem of peace in the season of bloodshed

== Politics ==
- In 2003, Sani contested for the Senate under Alliance for Democracy (AD) and lost to Senator Muktar Aruwa of the All Nigerian Peoples Party ANPP.
- In 2011, he contested for the senate under Congress for Progressive Change (CPC) and lost to Senator Sani Saleh in the primaries.
- In 2015, Sani won the senate seat after defeating Senator Sani Saleh in the primaries and defeated Senator Muktar Aruwa in the General Election.
- On 4 September 2015, he became the first and only Nigerian Senator to declare his assets publicly.
- On 20 October 2018, he announced his resignation from the ruling All Progressive Congress (APC) and defected to the Peoples Redemption Party (PRP) in Kaduna.

== Senate ==
He was the Senate Committee Chairman on Local & Foreign Debts and also served as the Vice Chairman on Senate Committee on Foreign Affairs.
