= Haruna Aziz Zeego =

Nigerian politician

Senator of the Federal Republic of Nigeria from Kaduna State South District
- In office 29 May 1999 – 29 May 2003
- Succeeded by: Isaiah Balat

Personal details
- Born: Kaduna State, Nigeria
- Party: People's Democratic Party

Haruna Aziz Zeego was elected Senator for the Kaduna South Senatorial District of Kaduna State, Nigeria at the start of the Nigerian Fourth Republic, running on the People's Democratic Party (PDP) platform. He took office on 29 May 1999.

After taking his seat in the Senate in June 1999, he was appointed to committees on Aviation (vice-chairman), Police Affairs, Women Affairs, Internal Affairs, Tourism & Culture and Social Development & Sports. Later he was appointed chairman of a committee on privatisation of the Nigerian Security Printing and Minting Company. In May 2001, he called on the Independent National Electoral Commission to restore the two-party system to avoid the possibility of emergence of tribal parties.
