= Kaduna South senatorial district =

Nigerian senatorial district in Kaduna State

Coordinates: 10.14°N 7.97°E

Kaduna South senatorial district covers eight local government areas of Kaduna State including Jaba, Jema'a, Kachia, Kagarko, Kaura, Kauru, Sanga, and Zangon Kataf. Kafanchan is the district headquarters.

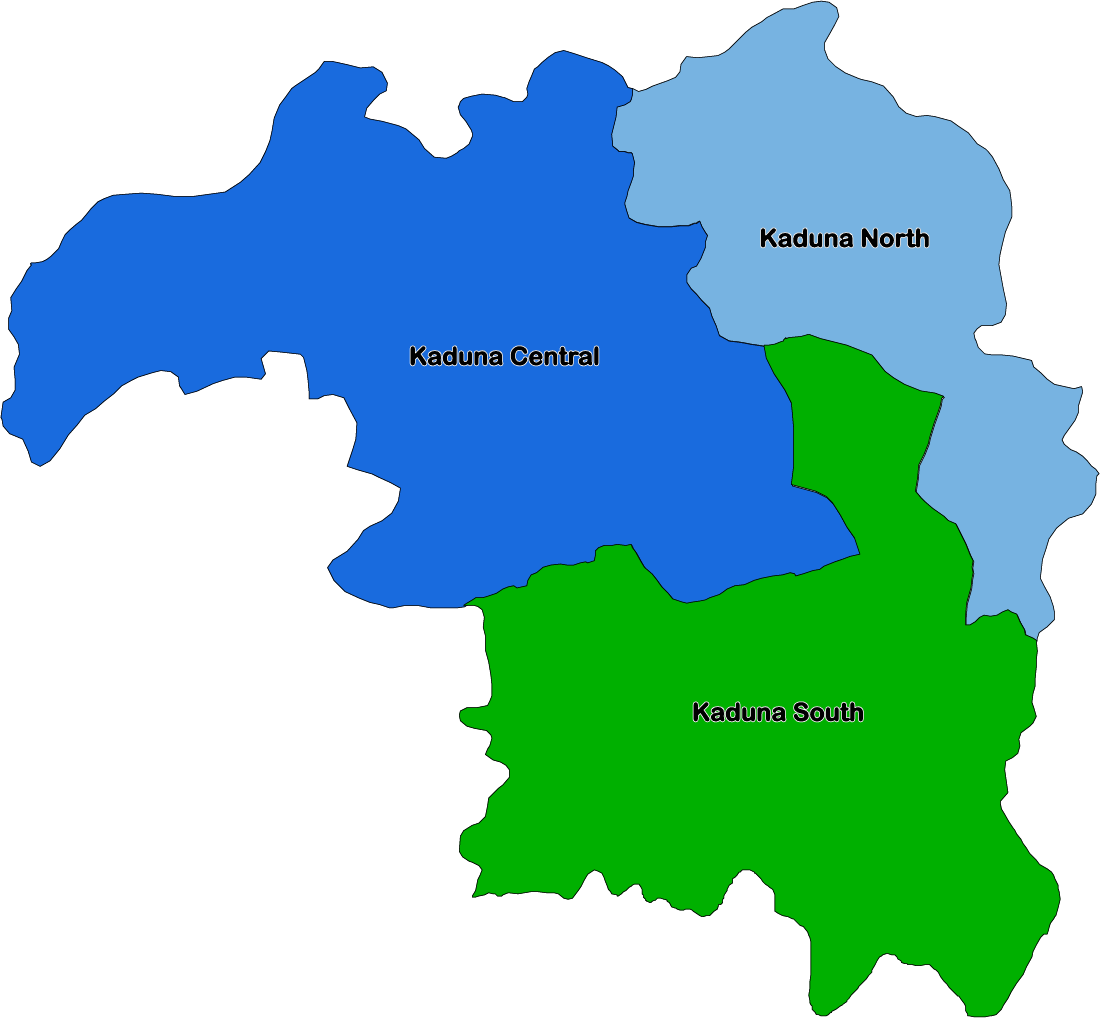
Kaduna South senatorial district coloured green.

== List of senators representing Kaduna South ==
Image	Senator	Party	Year	Assembly
	Haruna Aziz Zeego	PDP	1999–2003	4th
	Isaiah Balat	PDP	2003–2007	5th
	Caleb Zagi	PDP	2007–2011	6th
	Nenadi Usman	PDP	2011–2015	7th
	Danjuma Laah	PDP	2015–2023	8th 9th
	Sunday Marshall Katung	PDP	2023–present	10th

== See also ==
- Kaduna Central senatorial district
- Kaduna North senatorial district
