= Sabon Gari =

Section of cities and towns in Nigeria, Niger and Cameroon

Coordinates: 13.4683°N 5.0183°E

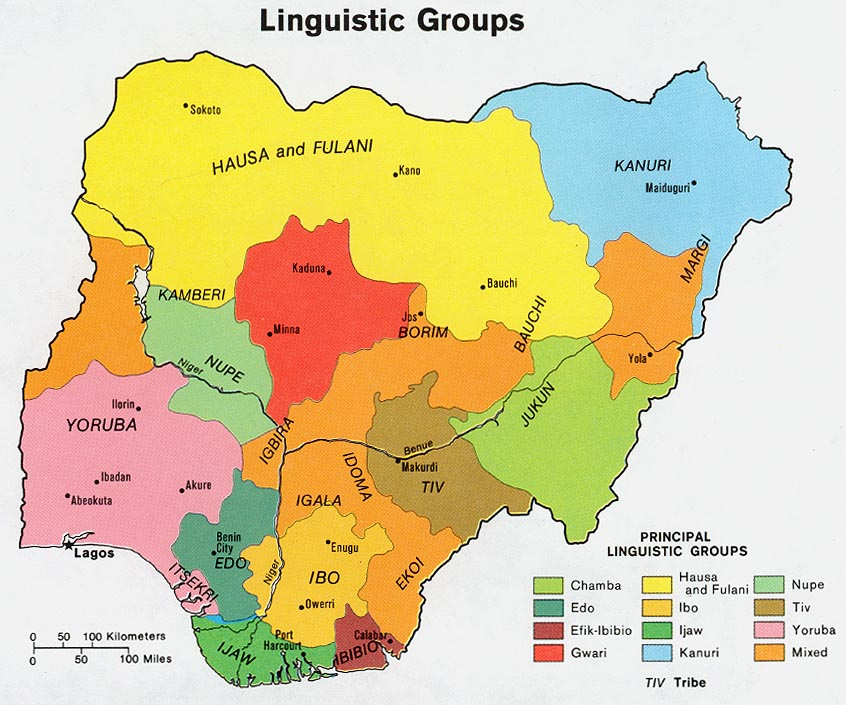
Linguistic and ethnic division of Nigeria

A Sabon Gari ("new town" or "new neighbourhood" in the Hausa language; plural Sabon Garuruwa) is a section of cities and towns in Northern Nigeria, south-central Niger and northern Cameroon whose residents either recent arrivals to the original settlements or sometimes not indigenous to Hausa lands. This is similar to towns and cities having a section named Tudun Wada.

== Historical background ==
Before the British arrived in Northern Nigeria in 1900, there were already established communities of new settlers who lived separately from the historic settlements where indigenous lived. However, despite their separation, these communities were still subjected to the authority of the local emir. With the passage of time, the composition of these communities began to change, and today, apart from Kano in Northern Nigeria, the Sabon Garis have become areas of mixed habitation.

The establishment of British colonial rule under Lord Frederick Lugard and the construction of new railway lines led to a large influx of laborers and traders from Southern Nigeria. The immigrants, which were mostly Igbo and Yoruba people, settled in new towns or Sabon Garuruwa, as these new towns were called by the local Hausa people. The Cantonments Proclamation of 1914 institutionalized this system of residential segregation. The Sabon Garuruwa became Native Reservations, officially reserved for employees of the government and commercial firms, and in practice inhabited by residents not indigenous to Northern Nigeria.

Under British colonial rule, power in Northern Nigeria was indirectly exercised through the emirs, who remained part of the colonial administration. Initially, the emirs administered the Sabon Garuruwa, but the Township Ordinance of 1917 shifted the administration of these areas and their residents directly to British rule. Residents of Sabon Garuruwa were granted more rights than those under the authority of the local emir. For instance, they had the opportunity to send representatives to the advisory board (court) responsible for their township and could choose between courts that applied either Muslim or British law.

Sabon Garuruwa were established in all major cities of Northern Nigeria, most notably in Kano, Kaduna and Zaria. One exception was Maiduguri, which never had a Sabon Gari. A typical city or town in Northern Nigeria would comprise:

- the old city within fortified walls and inhabited by indigenous Hausa or Fulani people,
- a Sabon Gari housing immigrants mostly from Southern Nigeria,
- a Tudun Wada housing people from Northern Nigeria that were not indigenous to the local area, and
- a few European Reservation Areas for European residents.

When General Johnson Aguiyi-Ironsi abolished the Nigerian federation in 1966 with Decree No. 34, it led to widespread pogroms against Igbos residing in Sabon Garuruwa in the Northern Region. These pogroms killed an estimated 8,000 to 30,000 Igbos—half of them children—and caused more than an estimated 1 to 2 million to flee to the Eastern Region.

Over time, the initially strict residential segregation would partially break down. Eventually, a typical Sabon Gari would house a diversity of people from all parts of Nigeria and to a lesser extent from other parts of West Africa. For example, in 1939 various ethnic groups were represented in the Sabon Gari of Kaduna as follows: 27% were Hausa, 11% were Igbo, 19% were Yoruba, 15% were Nupe and 28% were other ethnicities.

== Sabon Garuruwa today ==
Even today, Sabon Garuruwa are predominantly inhabited by people from Southern Nigeria. Ethnic and religious tensions between groups from southern and northern Nigeria lead to frequent riots and civil unrest in the Sabon Garuruwa of northern cities. With the introduction of Sharia legislation in some of the Northern states of Nigeria, some Sabon Garuruwa with predominantly Christian populations have become known for hosting activities forbidden elsewhere like alcohol consumption and gambling. Zinder and Maradi, the two largest Hausa cities in Niger's Hausa-speaking southeast, also retain Sabon Gari districts.

== See also ==
- Sabon Gari, Kaduna State
