= Mohammed Saleh (politician) =

Nigerian politician (born 1955)

Major general Mohammed Saleh

Senator for Kaduna Central
- In office May 2011 – May 2015
- Preceded by: Mohammed Kabiru Jibril
- Succeeded by: Shehu Sani

Personal details
- Born: 11 November 1955 (age 70) Kaduna State, Colony and Protectorate of Nigeria
- Party: Congress for Progressive Change (CPC)

Military service
- Allegiance: Nigeria
- Branch/service: Nigerian Army
- Rank: Major general

Mohammed Sani Saleh (born 11 November 1955) is a retired Nigerian army major general and former Senator representing Kaduna Central senatorial district at the Nigerian National Assembly, elected 9 April 2011 during the national elections on the platform of Congress for Progressive Change (CPC).

== Political career ==
In the 9 April 2011 elections, Saleh's competitors were the former executive secretary of the Petroleum Technology Development Fund, Hamisu Yusuf Abubakar (Mairago) of the People's Democratic Party (PDP), and Hajia Halima Aminu Turaki of the Action Congress of Nigeria (ACN). After being declared the winner, Saleh praised the Independent National Electoral Commission (INEC) for conduct of the election, saying "it has performed creditably well this time around, very commendable, I hope this will be repeated in subsequent elections".

During the Presidential elections on 16 April 2011, there was an attempt by youths in Kaduna to provoke an incident when Vice-president Namadi Sambo of the PDP arrived at a polling station to cast his vote. Saleh supported the authorities in suppressing the incident, saying "We must respect constituted authority. Even our tradition ask us to respect our elders". He again praised the conduct of the election, describing it as a model.
