= Kaduna Polytechnic =

Polytechnic in Kaduna, Nigeria

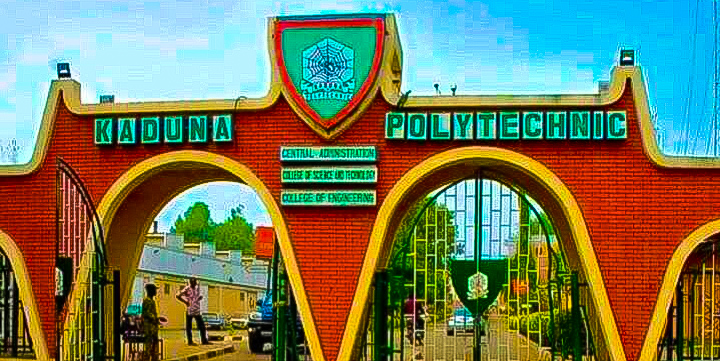
- Type: Public
- Established: 1956
- Rector: Dr. Suleiman Umar
- Students: 15,000 (2011)
- Location: Kaduna South LGA, Kaduna State, Nigeria; 10.523°N 7.414°E
- Campus: Urban
- Website: www.kadunapoly.edu.ng

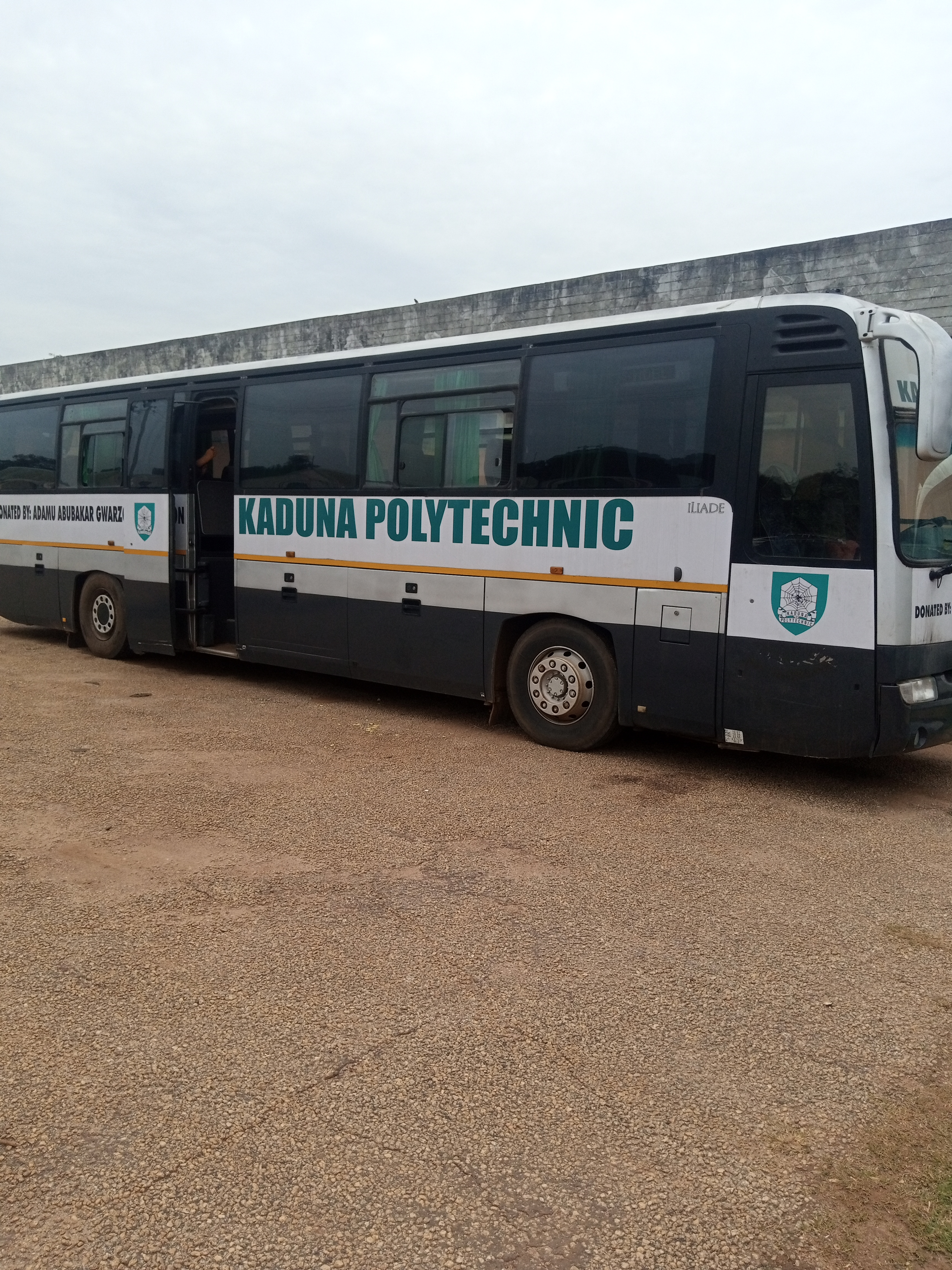
Kaduna Polytechnic student bus

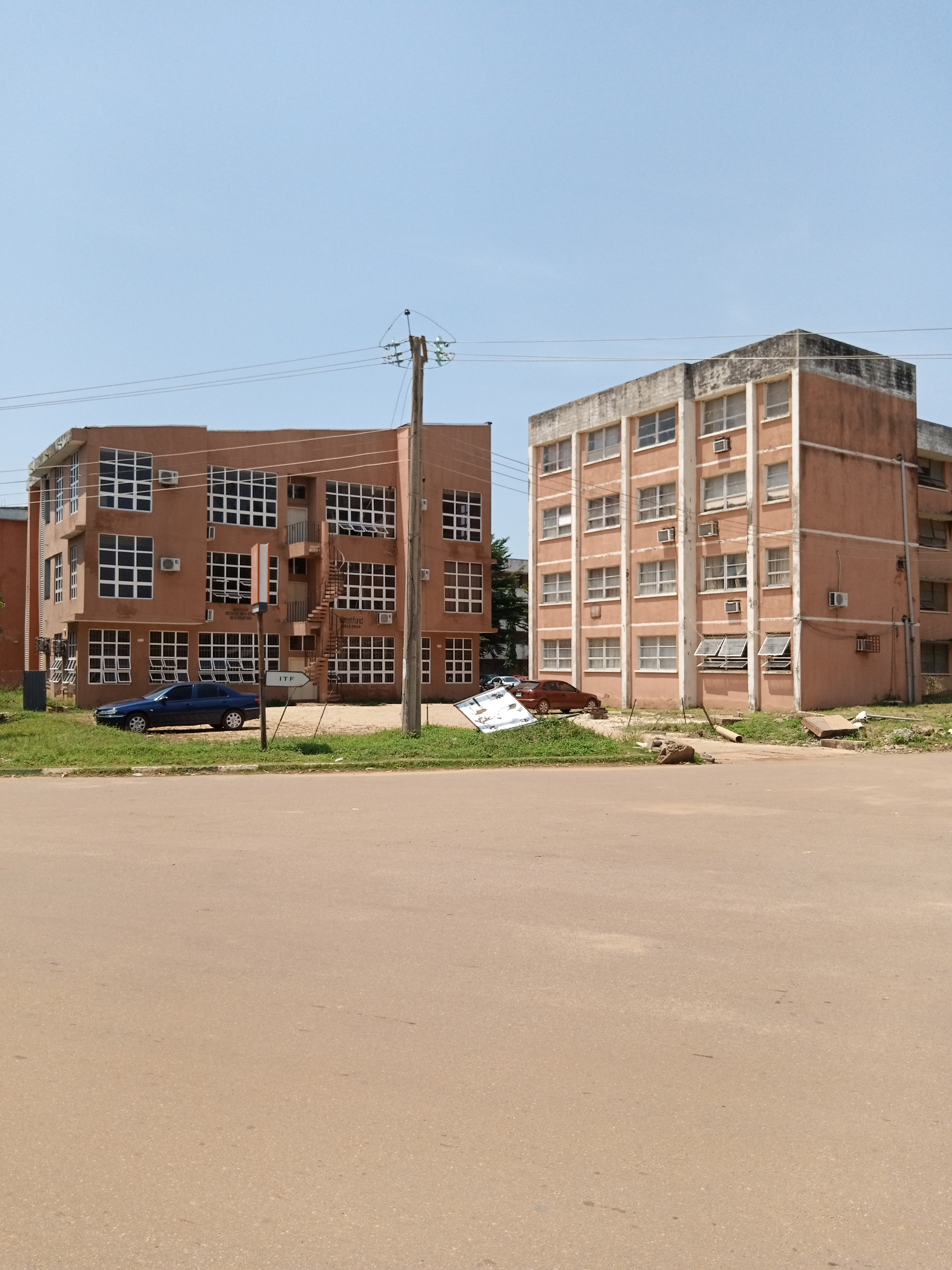
Statistic Department building

Kaduna Polytechnic is one of the earliest polytechnics in Nigeria, located in Tudun Wada area of Kaduna South local government of Kaduna state, North-Western Nigeria.

== History ==
It was established in 1956 as Kaduna Technical Institute after the British Government accepted the upgrading of Yaba Higher College (now Yaba College of Technology) to a technical institute and also proposed the establishment of technical institutes in Kaduna and Enugu through the recommendation of the Higher Education Commission. The Board of Governors of Kaduna Polytechnic was set up in 1991, with representatives of eleven state governments, universities, rectors. The board is responsible for the supervision and control of the school. They are called the Governing Council.

== See also ==
- List of polytechnics in Nigeria
