= Mohammed Aruwa =

Nigerian senator

Muktar Ahmed Mohammed Aruwa
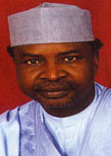

Senator of the Federal Republic of Nigeria from Kaduna Central Senatorial District
- In office 29 May 1999 – 29 May 2007
- Succeeded by: Mohammed Kabiru Jibril

Personal details
- Born: 1948 Kaduna State, Nigeria
- Died: 9 December 2018 (aged 70)
- Resting place: Unguwar Sarki Cemetery

Muktar Ahmed Mohammed Aruwa (1948 – 9 December 2018) was a Nigerian senator. He was first elected to the senate in 1999 as a representative of Kaduna State for the All People's Party (APP). Aruwa sat on several senate committees and opposed the privatization of public enterprises. He was re-elected in 2003 as a member of the All Nigeria Peoples Party (ANPP), the successor to the APP. He was involved in a dispute over committee appointments, claiming unfair play by the senate leadership. Aruwa's name was dropped from the ANPP party list for the 2007 election.

== First Senate term ==
Muktar Ahmed Mohammed Aruwa was elected Senator for the Kaduna Central constituency of Kaduna State, Nigeria at the start of the Nigerian Fourth Republic, running on the All People's Party (APP) platform. He took office on 29 May 1999.

After taking his seat in the Senate Aruwa was appointed to committees on Senate Services, Aviation, Works & Housing, Police Affairs, Agriculture (vice-chairman) and Finance & Appropriation. In April 2000, he said he would not submit to Sharia law, saying "Even in true Islamic countries, there is no total application of Sharia. There is reformation going on now", and saying Sharia violated some human rights. In August 2002, he moved to halt the privatization of public enterprises pending amendment of the law governing the National Council on Privatization to bring it into line with the 1999 constitution.

== Second Senate term ==
Aruwa was reelected on the All Nigeria People's Party (ANPP) platform for a further four-year term in 2003. In May 2005, Aruwa was appointed to an ad-hoc Senate committee on media relations, formed to present the Senate position to the public if President Olusegun Obasanjo insisted on reviewing the budget after it had been signed into law. The Senate view was that this would be grounds for impeaching the President. In September 2005, he rejected a posting as vice-chairman of the Senate Committee on Women Affairs, accusing the Senate leadership of playing dirty politics with Committee positions. In November 2005, the Senate President Ken Nnamani announced that Aruwa had been dropped from the National Assembly Joint Committee on the Review of the 1999 Constitution, which was considering the possibility of allowing President Obasanjo to run for a third term. Aruwa was opposed to this change.

== Later career ==
Aruwa was a contender to be the ANPP candidate for governor of Kaduna State in 2007, winning the primaries, but the party replaced him with Sani Sha'aban on the list submitted to the Independent National Electoral Commission (INEC). Aruwa disputed the legality of the substitution. It was reportedly made because his name was included in the list of politicians indicted by Nuhu Ribadu's Economic and Financial Crimes Commission. In May 2007, following the election but before the new government had assumed its duties, Aruwa moved for a review of the conduct and outcome of the elections, but later withdrew the motion before it was debated by the Senate. However, the senate did agree with his recommendation to set up a joint committee to review how INEC had managed funds allocated to it for the conduct of the elections.

Speaking to the press in April 2010, Aruwa said that membership of the ANPP by former military ruler Major-General Muhammadu Buhari had done the party great harm.

Aruwa died in the early hours of 9 December 2018. He was buried the next day at Unguwar Sarki Cemetery with Islamic rites. The funeral was attended by hundreds of mourners including former vice-president Namadi Sambo and governor of Kaduna State Nasir Ahmad el-Rufai. Aruwa was survived by his wives and eight children, two sons and six daughters.

== Death ==
He died on 10 December 2018, after a brief illness.
