= Danjuma Laah =

Nigerian politician (born 1960)

Chief (Dr.) Danjuma Laah
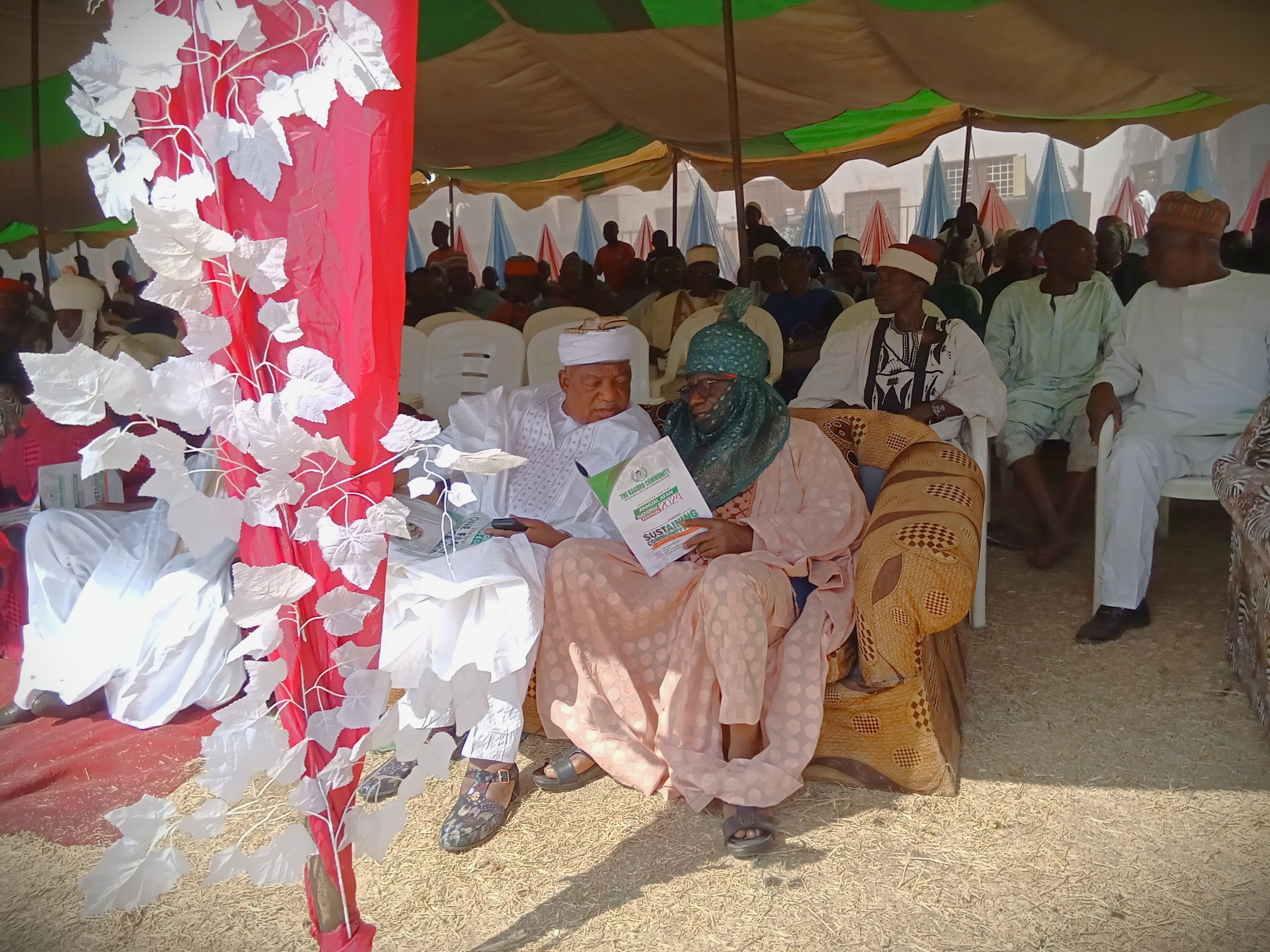
- Danjuma Laah at Afan Festival

Senator for Kaduna South
- In office 9 June 2015 – 11 June 2023
- Preceded by: Esther Nenadi Usman
- Succeeded by: Sunday Marshall Katung

Personal details
- Born: 16 February 1960 (age 66)
- Party: People's Democratic Party
- Profession: Politician; businessman

Danjuma Tella Laah (born 16 February 1960) is a Nigerian politician and senator who represented Kaduna South Senatorial District of Kaduna state from 2015 to 2023.

== Early life and education ==
Laah was born on 16 February 1960. He attended Baptist Primary School, Kwoi, and later Government Secondary School, Kagoro, both in present-day Kaduna State. He subsequently obtained a diploma in accounting and later earned a degree in accounting.

He also obtained a Master of Business Administration (MBA) degree from Abubakar Tafawa Balewa University, Bauchi.

== Political career ==
Laah was elected to the Nigerian Senate in 2015 to represent Kaduna South Senatorial District on the platform of the People's Democratic Party (PDP).

In the 2019 general election, he was re-elected after defeating Yusuf Barnabas Bala of the All Progressives Congress (APC).

During his second term, he served as the Deputy Minority Whip

During his tenure, he advocated peaceful coexistence among the diverse religious and ethnic communities in Southern Kaduna and sponsored bills, including proposals for the establishment of the Federal University of Science and Technology, Manchok, and a Police College in Tum, Kaduna State.
