= Dalhatu Tafida =

Nigerian politician

Dalhatu Sarki Tafida
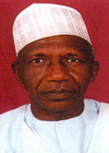

Senator of the Federal Republic of Nigeria from Kaduna State North District
- In office 29 May 1999 – 29 May 2007
- Succeeded by: Ahmed Makarfi

Personal details
- Born: 24 November 1940 (age 85) Zaria, Kaduna State, Nigeria
- Party: People's Democratic Party

Dalhatu Sarki Tafida (born 24 November 1940) was elected Senator for the Kaduna North Senatorial District of Kaduna State, Nigeria at the start of the Nigerian Fourth Republic, running on the People's Democratic Party (PDP) platform. He took office on 29 May 1999. He was reelected for a further four-year term in 2003.

== Birth and early career ==
Tafida was born on 24 November 1940 in Zaria, Kaduna State. He attended Barewa College, Zaria (1954 - 1959) and Government College, Keffi (1960 - 1961), then was admitted to the College of Medicine, University of Lagos (1962-1967) where he earned the degrees of Bachelor of Medicine and Bachelor of Surgery. He was House Officer and then Senior House Officer at Ahmadu Bello University, (1967 - 1969) and Registrar (1969 - 1970). He studied at the Royal Victoria Infirmary, Newcastle upon Tyne, England (1970 - 1971) and the University of Liverpool, England (1971-1972), obtaining a Postgraduate Diploma in Public Health.

Later he studied at Johns Hopkins University in the USA (1974).

Tafida was Senior Registrar in Medicine in Katsina Specialist Hospital (1972 - 1973), Consultant Physician to the Kaduna State Ministry of Health (1973 - 1976) and Permanent Secretary of the Kaduna State Ministry of Health (1976 - 1980).

He was personal physician to President Shehu Shagari (1980 - 1983).

In 1983, he was awarded the Order of the Federal Republic (OFR).

He was Commissioner of Health, Commissioner of Agriculture and then Commissioner of Education in Kaduna State between 1984 and 1987. In the 1992 presidential primaries for the National Republican Convention (NRC) Tafida defeated former military ruler General Yakubu Gowon in the Zaria ward under the Option A4 system.

He was appointed Federal Minister of Health between 1993 and 1995.

He was a member of the United Nigeria Congress Party together with politicians such as Atiku Abubakar, Abdullahi Aliyu Sumaila and Tony Anenih, he was given the traditional title of Tafidan Zazzau in 1995.

== Senate career ==
After taking his seat in the Senate in June 1999, Tafida was appointed to committees on Rules & Procedures (chairman), Science & Technology, Health, Agriculture and Drug & Narcotics.

During his second term Tafida was the Senate Majority Leader.

In March 2006, he was said to be collaborating with Deputy Senate President Ibrahim Mantu in pushing for a change to the constitution to allow President Olusegun Obasanjo to run for a third term. Tafida defended the third term proposal on the basis that it would allow for quicker rotation between the north and south, and pointed out that if passed there was no guarantee that Obasanjo would win election.

The Advance Congress of Democrats (ACD) called for Mantu and Tafida to resign immediately pending investigation of a scandal where it was alleged bribes had been offered for votes for the third term extension. Tafida denied involvement in bribing members of the National Assembly Joint Constitution Review Conference.

In the April 2006 Senate debate over allegations of financial impropriety by Mantu, Tafida unsuccessfully moved for a closed hearing, but was among the senators who won a close vote that the Committee on Ethics, Privileges and Public Petitions should investigate Mantu rather than having him immediately suspended.

== Later career ==
Tafida launched a bid to run for the Senate for a third term and emerged as the PDP flag bearer unopposed. His campaign however hit a snag when the party decided in controversial circumstances to hand the ticket to Ahmed Makarfi, who was never a participant at the primaries that saw the emergence of Tafida as the Party's flag bearer. Makarfi had completed two terms in office as State Governor and eventually replaced Tafida in the Senate.

After leaving the Senate, Tafida was appointed Nigeria High Commissioner to the United Kingdom, presenting his Letters of Credence to Her Majesty Queen Elizabeth II on 30 May 2008. In March 2009, he noted a growth in applications for Nigerian visas at the High Commission, pointing out the importance of economic ties between the two countries despite the negative image due to oil field kidnappings, advance fee fraud and other problems.

In 2010, then President Goodluck Ebele Jonathan appointed Tafida as the Director-General of his presidential campaign.

In January 2010, he formally opened a new visa hall, which was expected to reduce delays in obtaining Nigerian visas.

In April 2010, Tafida reacted quickly when the BBC aired a documentary that showed Lagos as one huge slum.

His letter of protest to the BBC2 Controller noted "dismay and disappointment" about the documentary, and registered "strong rejection of this documentary as a deliberate distortion of life in Lagos".
