= Suleiman Othman Hunkuyi =

Nigerian politician (born 1959)

Senator for Kaduna North
- In office June 2015 – June 2019
- Preceded by: Ahmed Makarfi
- Succeeded by: Suleiman Abdu Kwari

Personal details
- Born: 17 July 1959 (age 67) Kudan LGA, Kaduna State, Nigeria
- Party: People's Democratic Party - PDP
- Education: Ahmadu Bello University
- Profession: Teacher; politician
- Nickname: Hunkuyi

Suleiman Othman Hunkuyi (born 17 July 1959) is a Nigerian politician who became the senator of Kaduna North Senatorial District at the Federal Republic of Nigeria's Senate in 2015 Nigerian general elections.

Hunkuyi was elected the chairman Kudan local government area of Kaduna state, he then contested and won the Kaduna North Senatorial District election on 28 March 2015.

Senator Hunkuyi, declared that the Governor of Kaduna State Malam Nasir El-Rufai has not been fair to the people of the State, and vowed to "do everything possible" to vote him out in the next election in 2019.

== Early life and education ==
Senator Hunkuyi had attended the Kafanchan Teachers College later proceeded to Ahmadu Bello University and graduated with a bachelor's degree of Education (B.ed) in 1986.

== 2023 elections ==
Hunkuyi emerged as the gubernatorial aspirant of New Nigeria People's Party (NNPP). In 2022, he dumped People Democratic Party (PDP) for NNPP.
