= Kafanchan =

Town, chiefdom, sub-group, dialect in Kaduna State, Nigeria

Kafanchan Fantswam, A̱byin Fantswam
- Town
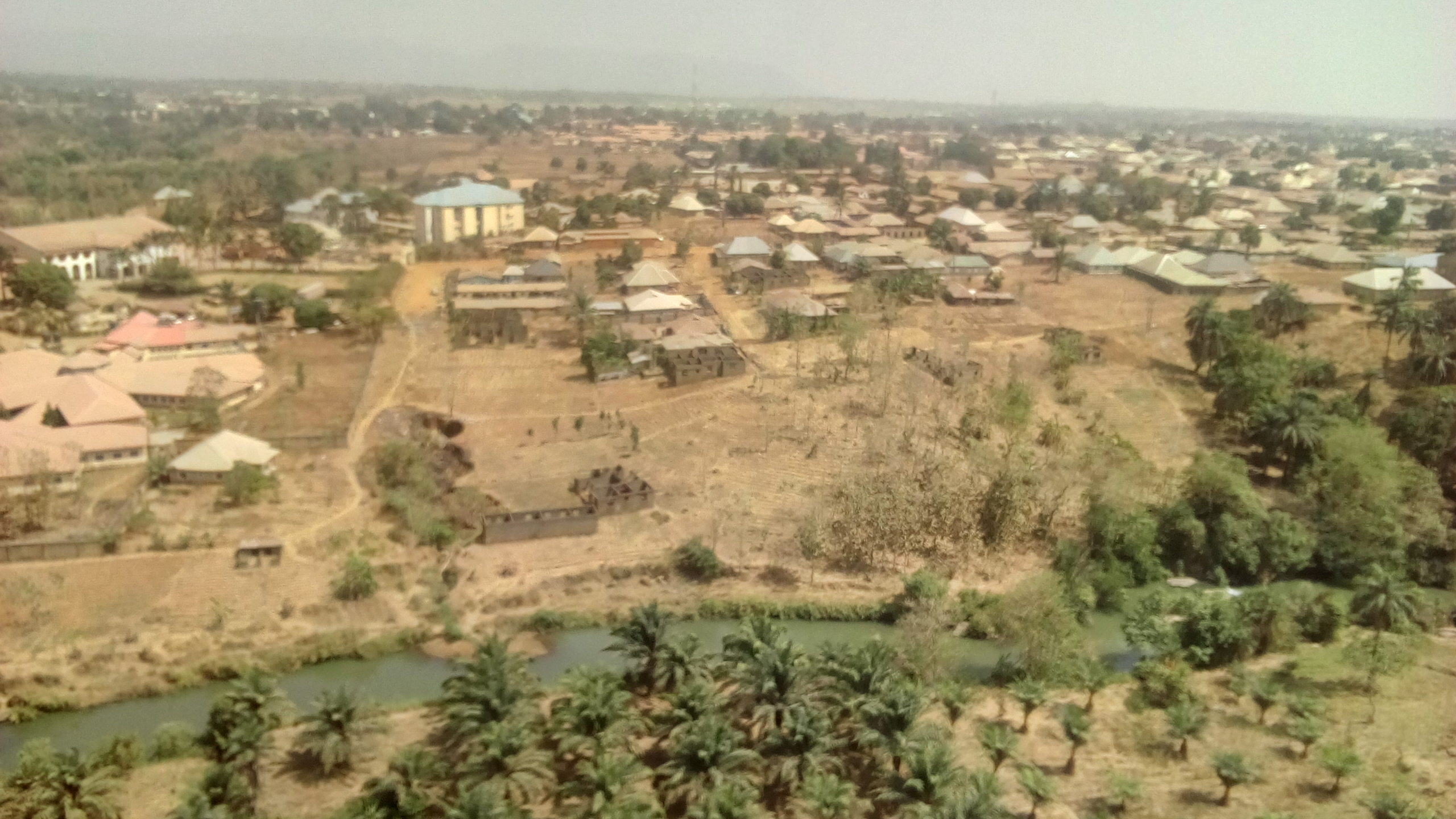
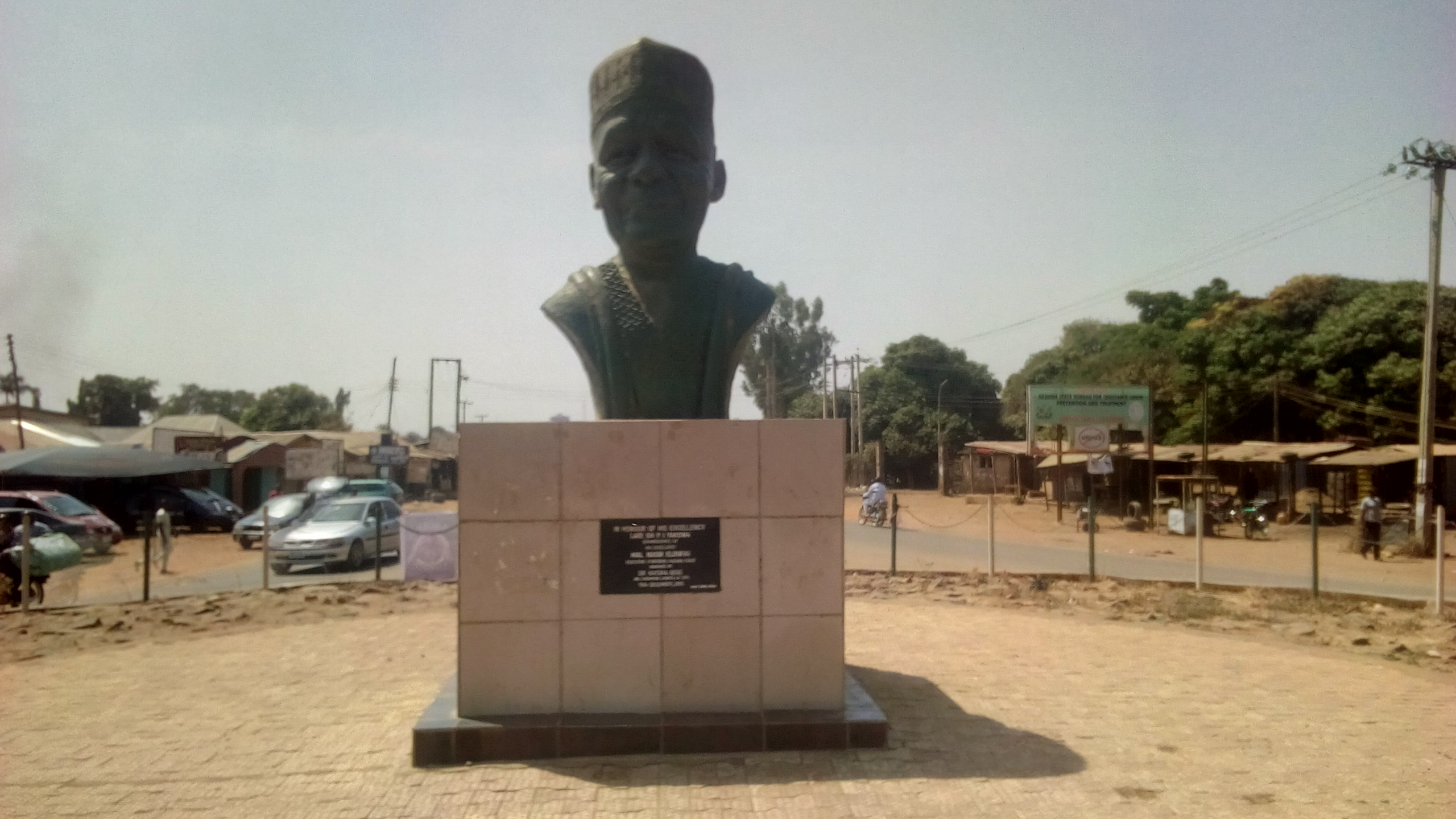
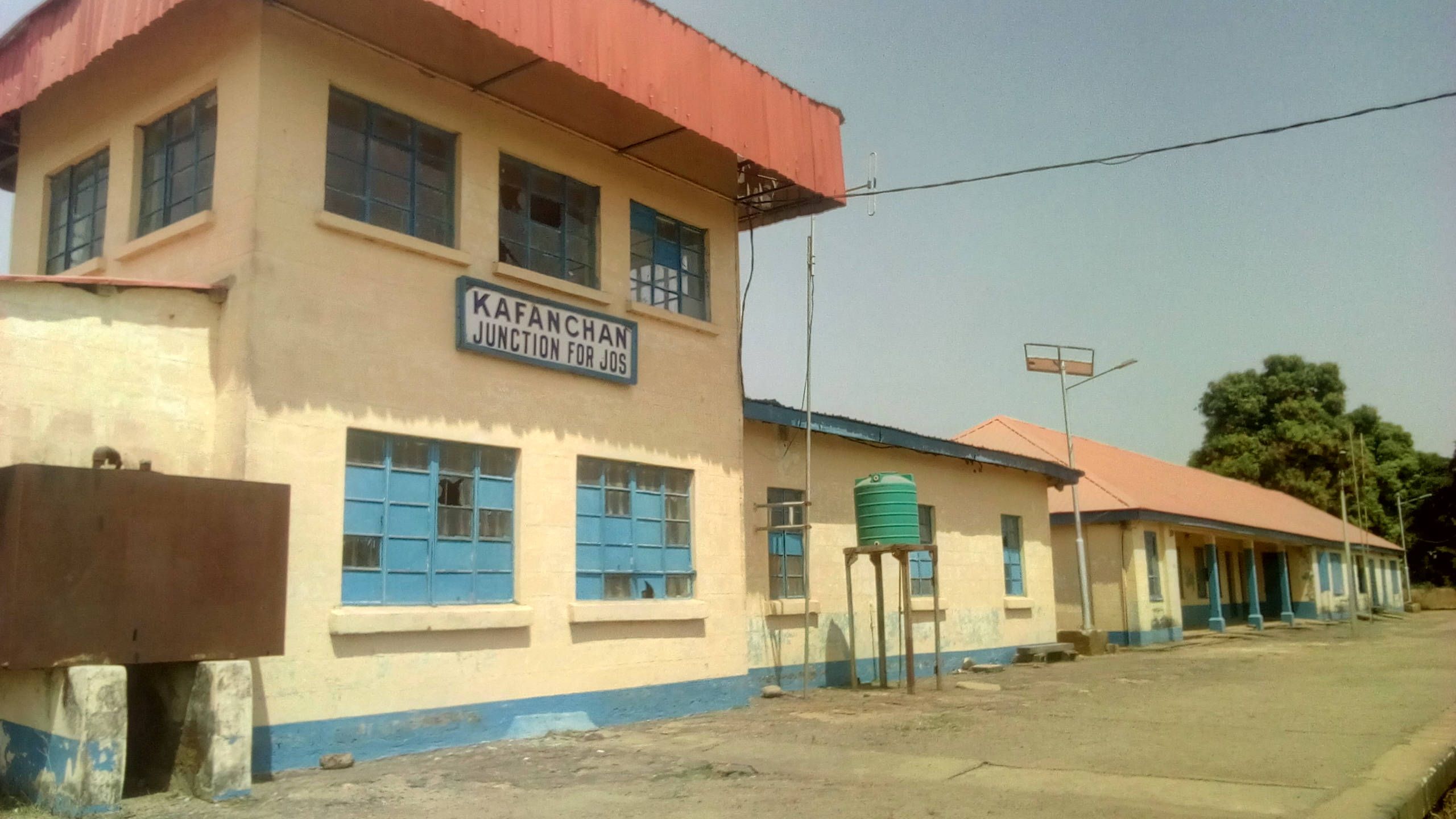
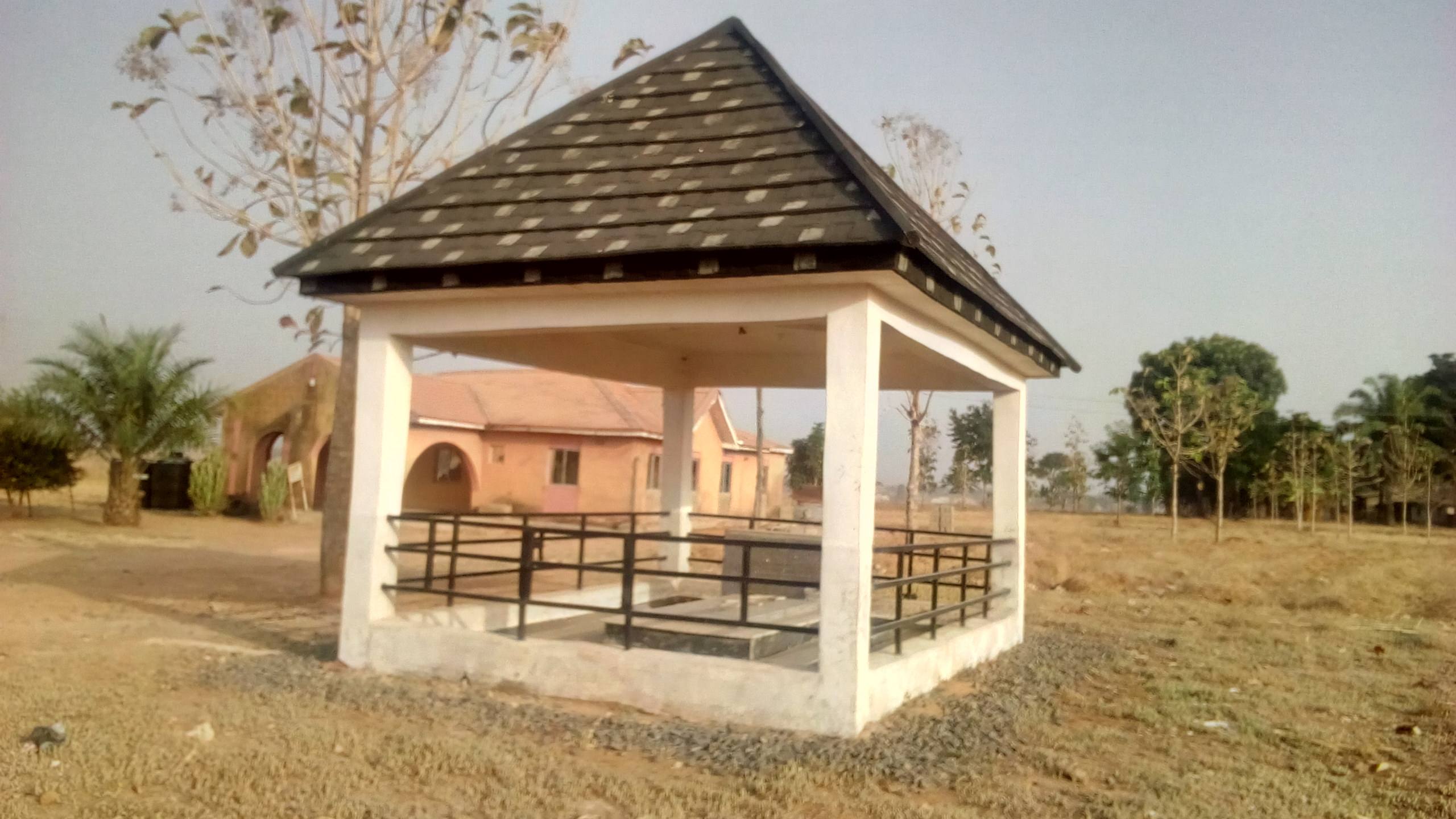
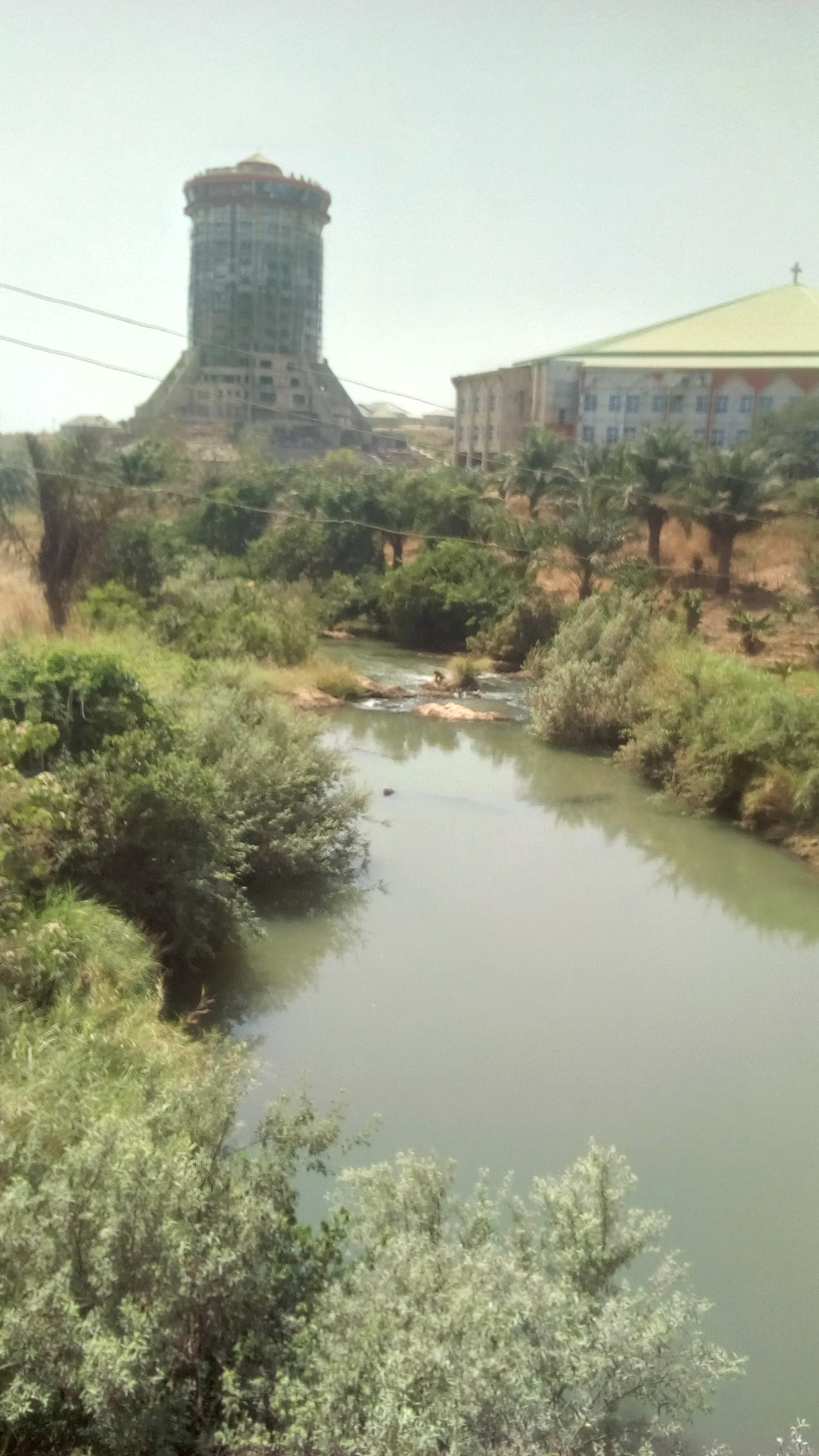
- Clockwise from top: An aerial view of Kafanchan • Kafanchan Junction Train Station to Jos • Resting place of Agwam Fantswam I Musa Didam at Zikpak • Throneroom's Salama Radio tower at the background of the Mada River flowing westwards • A bust of Governor Patrick Yakowa at the middle of the NEPA roundabout
- Nickname: Kaf City
- Location of Kafanchan within Nigeria Kafanchan (Africa)
- Coordinates: 9°35′00″N 8°17′33″E
- Country: Nigeria
- State: Kaduna State
- LGA: Jema'a
- Chiefdom: Fantswam (Kafanchan)
- Divisional headquarters, Jemaa: 1927
- Founder: Fantswam people
- Named for: People, land and dialect of founding group

Government
  - Agwam Fantswam: HH Agwam (Dr.) Josiah Tagwai Kantiyok
- Elevation: 742 m (2,434 ft)
- Time zone: UTC+1 (WAT)
- Postcode: 801

Kafanchan (Tyap: Fantswam; Nikyob: Manɡyanɡ) is a town located in the southern part of Kaduna State, Nigeria. The town owes much of its development to the railway development in the area. The railway is situated at a particular junction of the Nigerian Railway Corporation (NRC) station built in 1927. It sits on the railtrack connecting Port Harcourt, Enugu, Kafanchan, Kuru, Bauchi and finally Maiduguri. As of 2007, Kafanchan had an estimated population of 83,092.

== Etymology ==
James (2000) asserted that the indigenous inhabitants of the Kafanchan town and environs, the Fantswam people (who speak a dialect of Tyap), usually add the prefix kwa to all names of peoples and places, hence, the phrase, "kwa Fantswam". However, the Hausa immigrant elements who interacted with them found it more convenient to pronounce the phrase, kwa-Fantswam as Kafanchan.

The town developed as a result of British colonial commercial activities, that is, a railway junction town in the early 20th century. This fact brings another claim as to how the name Kafanchan came into existence. It was said that the name originated during the Nigeria railway construction period in the 1920s. Then, when the railtrack crossbars were being laid, the white man would say in Hausa kafa chan (which sounds "Kafanchan!") which literally means "leg there," i.e. "put your leg there," then a crossbar would be laid after the labourer widens his leg, pushing a leg forward. Hence, the name Kafanchan. The above account, however, seems to be false, as the name "Kafanchan" was mentioned by A.J.N. Tremearne in his notes published in 1912, over a decade before the railway construction began in the area.

In the words of the Agwam Fantswam I, Musa Didam:

latter-day settlers corrupted Fantswam to Kafanchan.

In addition, he viewed the popularising of the word as a work of the British colonial authorities. The colonial writer Harold D. Gunn was also stated to have rendered the spelling as "Kabanchan" and accordingly gave names to related groups using their non-native words on pages 80–81 of his book Pagan Peoples of the Central Area of Northern Nigeria. His non-native names for related groups included: Kaje, Kagoro and Kaninkon instead of Bajju, A̱gworok and Ninkyob.

== History ==
In the oral narrative given by the Agwam Fantswam I, reported by a writer for Sun Travels, the original home of the Fantswam (Kafanchan) people was traced to Inkil, a settlement in the eastern part of Bauchi State, 5 km from the modern city of Bauchi. The people were said to have left Inkil to settle at a riverine settlement called Bunga, and later on at Karge to the south. Having discovered that there was not enough game around Karge, being hunters, they moved across Zalan to the Jos Plateau, settling temporarily at the present abode of the Anaguta and Afizere (Jarawa) peoples, before proceeding through Rahama, Kauru and subsequently settling at Mashan in Atyap Chiefdom. A need birthed their advancement down to Magata, Kacecere, Zali (Malagum) and then to their present abode, Kafanchan, where they discovered enough games and protection from slave raiders, due to the thickly forested environment and thus chose to stay.

A version by Simon Yohanna (in History of the Fantswam People) has it that the Fantswam "by historical evidence and cultural treats" came from the Bauchi area alongside their Atyap kins, probably around the 17th century AD, from Mashan, split, venturing to Zali (Malagum) where a member of the migrants shot an elephant, which ran into the forested eastern fringe of the Gworok hills with available wild bananas natively called tsuntswan, whereat they adopted the name "Fantswam". Being hunters, they pursued it until they met where it fell within the plains. They finally settled there and became the aboriginal inhabitants of the present-day Kafanchan plains.

A wave of migration caused by human and environmental factors such as the Fulani Jihad and slave raids and famine resulted in other kin sub-groups such as the Nikyob (Hausa: Kaninkon), the Bajju and the Atyap ("Mabatado") settling among the Fantswam. In the early years of the Fulani Jihad of the early 1800s, the Fulani ran being annihilated by the Kajuru Hausa chief. Usman Yabo led his people from Kajuru to settle in a place they named Jama'a Dororo meaning "people of Dororo" and founded an emirate amidst the people who gave him and his people the portion of land where they stayed, south of Fantswam territory. After the formation of the Plateau province (1926), in 1933, the British colonial authorities encouraged the migration of the Hausa-Fulani community of about 955 from Jama'a Daroro to Kafanchan town. The new community settled in the area they called "Jama'a Sarari", a Hausa-Arabic phrase meaning "people of the plains". The Jama'a Emirate is a vassal state of the Zaria Emirate.

In addition to the colonial officers and missionaries who came in the 1900s, the completion of the busy railway line linking the Kaduna station with the Kuru and the Port Harcourt railway stations in 1927, enabled Kafanchan to experience a heavy influx of migrants from all over the country in search for job and trading opportunities, most notably, the Igbo people from Nigeria's southeast, many of whom left before the Nigerian Civil War in 1967, although some later returned. Yorubas mainly from Ibadan, Ogbomosho and Offa in the southwest also came and settled in considerable amounts in the expanding town, some of whom brought with them their handworks and trades. A good number of the Igbos were engine drivers or rail engine mechanics.

M. G. Smith noted that the Fantswam had been regarded by the British colonial government and writers like C. K. Meek as the part of the Agworok (H. Kagoro) under the Jema'a emirate, not until about the late 1950s were they recognized as a distinct political group. Their town served as the site of the British Divisional Headquarters for Jema'a.

After the death of the emir of Jama'a in 1998, there was resentment toward the turbaning of his son as the next emir. In 1999, the son of the late emir was unpopularly turbaned, leading to a public uprising in Kafanchan. The Southern Kaduna indigenous people of the area, under the auspices of the Indigenous People of Jema'a (ICJ) responded to the turbaning by filing a suit against the Kaduna State government at the Kafanchan High Court. The Southern Kaduna people clamoured for the scrapping of the emirate system on their soil, as it was an alien institution imposed on them by the British colonialists. A result could not be ascertained until the new democratic regime came into being.

However, in the year 2001, the then-governor of Kaduna State, Ahmed Mohammed Makarfi, created the Fantswam and Nikyob-Nindem chiefdoms amidst over ten others in the Southern Kaduna area, thereby partially ending the 20th-century imposition of the Fantswam people and her kins under emirate rule. However, the Jema'an emirate remains an institution of the Hausa-Fulani inhabitants.

Today, Kafanchan is a melting pot of many Nigerians from parts of southern Kaduna such as the Gwong and the Ham, and other parts of Nigeria.

== Geography ==
=== Landscape ===
The town lies within the Southern Guinea Zone, consisting of forests and savannah lands, and is located southwest of the Jos Plateau escarpment on the windward region. The relief consists of two main rivers, Sanga (same as the Kogum River) and Amere (same as the Mada River and River Wonderful), both sourced from the plateau, with the former merging with the latter close to the Kogum River Station and finally emptying into the Benue River. There lie in addition, numerous hills, valleys streams. The undulating lands also provide fertile grounds for agricultural activities. The town has an altitude of 742m.

=== Climate ===
Kafanchan has an average annual temperature of about 25.3 °C (77.5 °F) with average yearly highs of about 28.6 °C (83.5 °F) and lows of 18.8 °C (65.8 °F). The town has zero rainfalls at the ends and beginnings of the year with a yearly precipitation of about 28.1 mm (1.11 in) on average, and an average humidity of 53.7%, similar to that of Kagoro.

Climate data for Kafanchan (742m altitude)
Month	Jan	Feb	Mar	Apr	May	Jun	Jul	Aug	Sep	Oct	Nov	Dec	Year
Record high °C (°F)	31 (88)	33 (91)	34 (93)	34 (93)	31 (88)	29 (84)	26 (79)	25 (77)	27 (81)	29 (84)	30 (86)	29 (84)	29.8 (85.6)
Mean daily maximum °C (°F)	29 (84)	32 (90)	34 (93)	33 (91)	30 (86)	27 (81)	24 (75)	22 (72)	24 (75)	28 (82)	29 (84)	31 (88)	28.6 (83.5)
Daily mean °C (°F)	24 (75)	26 (79)	29 (84)	29 (84)	26 (79)	24 (75)	21 (70)	20 (68)	22 (72)	25 (77)	25 (77)	26 (79)	25.3 (77.5)
Mean daily minimum °C (°F)	15 (59)	17 (63)	21 (70)	22 (72)	20 (68)	19 (66)	18 (64)	17 (63)	18 (64)	20 (68)	19 (66)	19 (66)	18.8 (65.8)
Record low °C (°F)	14 (57)	16 (61)	20 (68)	21 (70)	21 (70)	20 (68)	19 (66)	18 (64)	19 (66)	19 (66)	18 (64)	15 (59)	18.3 (64.9)
Average precipitation mm (inches)	0 (0)	1 (0.0)	3.1 (0.12)	13.5 (0.53)	35.5 (1.40)	54.2 (2.13)	71.2 (2.80)	69 (2.7)	60.3 (2.37)	29.3 (1.15)	0.1 (0.00)	0 (0)	28.1 (1.11)
Average precipitation days	0	1	4	12	23	28	31	30	29	18	0	0	14.7
Average relative humidity (%)	24	18	28	48	66	80	88	90	86	61	32	23	53.7
Source: World Weather Online

== Language ==
Fantswam, otherwise known as "Kafanchan" is a dialect of Tyap, alongside six or seven others: Gworok, Sholyio, Takad, "Mabatado" Tyap, Tyeca̱rak and Tyuku, and also Jju seems to be a dialect of Tyap.

=== Counting in Fantswam ===
	Tyap (Fantswam)
0	Piit/Gum
1	A̱nyiung (also Jyiung, Nyiung)
2	A̱feang (also Sweang, Feang)
3	A̱tat (also Tsat, Tat)
4	A̱naai (also Nyaai, Naai)
5	A̱tfwuon (also (Tswuon, Fwuon)
6	Ka̱taa
7	Natat
8	Naimbwak
9	Kubunyiunɡ
10	Swak
11	Swak bi̱ a̱nyiung
12	Swak bi̱ a̱feang
13	Swak bi̱ a̱tat
14	Swak bi̱ a̱naai
15	Swak bi̱ a̱tfwuon
16	Swak bi̱ ka̱taa
17	Swak bi̱ natat
18	Swak bi̱ naimbwak
19	Swak bi̱ kubunyiunɡ
20	Nswak nfeanɡ
30	Nswak ntat
31	Nswak ntat bi̱ a̱nyiung
32	Nswak ntat bi̱ a̱feang
33	Nswak ntat bi̱ a̱tat
34	Nswak ntat bi̱ a̱naai
35	Nswak ntat bi̱ a̱tfwuon
36	Nswak ntat bi̱ ka̱taa
37	Nswak ntat bi̱ natat
38	Nswak ntat bi̱ naimbwak
39	Nswak ntat bi̱ kubunyiunɡ
40	Nswak nnaai
50	Nswak ntfwuon
60	Nswak ka̠taa
70	Nswak natat
80	Nswak naimbwak
90	Nswak kubunyiunɡ
100	Cyi jyiunɡ
200	Cyi sweanɡ
300	Cyi tsat
400	Cyi nyaai
500	Cyi tswuon
600	Cyi ka̠taa
700	Cyi natat
800	Cyi naimbwak
900	Cyi kubunyiunɡ
1,000	Cyikwop jyiunɡ
2,020	Cyikwop sweanɡ bi̱ nswak nfeanɡ
100,000	Cyikwop cyi jyiunɡ
1,000,000	Cyikwop cyikwop jyiunɡ

=== Common Expressions in Fantswam ===
	Tyap (Fantswam)	English
1	A nyia ni?	How are you?
2	N tfwuonɡ zonɡ.	I am hunɡry.
3	Mashyi ta̱bat nunɡ.	I am thirsty.
4	Bai a ya kyanɡya.	Come and eat food.
5	Bai a fwua sa̱khwot.	Come and drink water.
6	Yok zi̱ tyia̱ a̱byin nji̱t ti bi̱ naai, ma Gwaza.	Let us put our land in prayers, onto God!
7	N cat a.	I love you.
8	N shyia̱ a̱ka̱li.	I am at home.
9	N na ngyuronɡ a.	I will call you.
10	Shyicet a ku labeang!	May you live long!
11	Zi̱ tunɡ ndunɡ, zi̱ beanɡ á̱yaan.	Let's come toɡether, let's help one another.
12	N gwai!	Thank you!

One word you are sure to find funny if you visit Fantswam (Kafanchan) and surroundinɡ areas of southern Kaduna is the exclamation, "Kwot!" (What?!).

== Culture ==
=== Beliefs ===
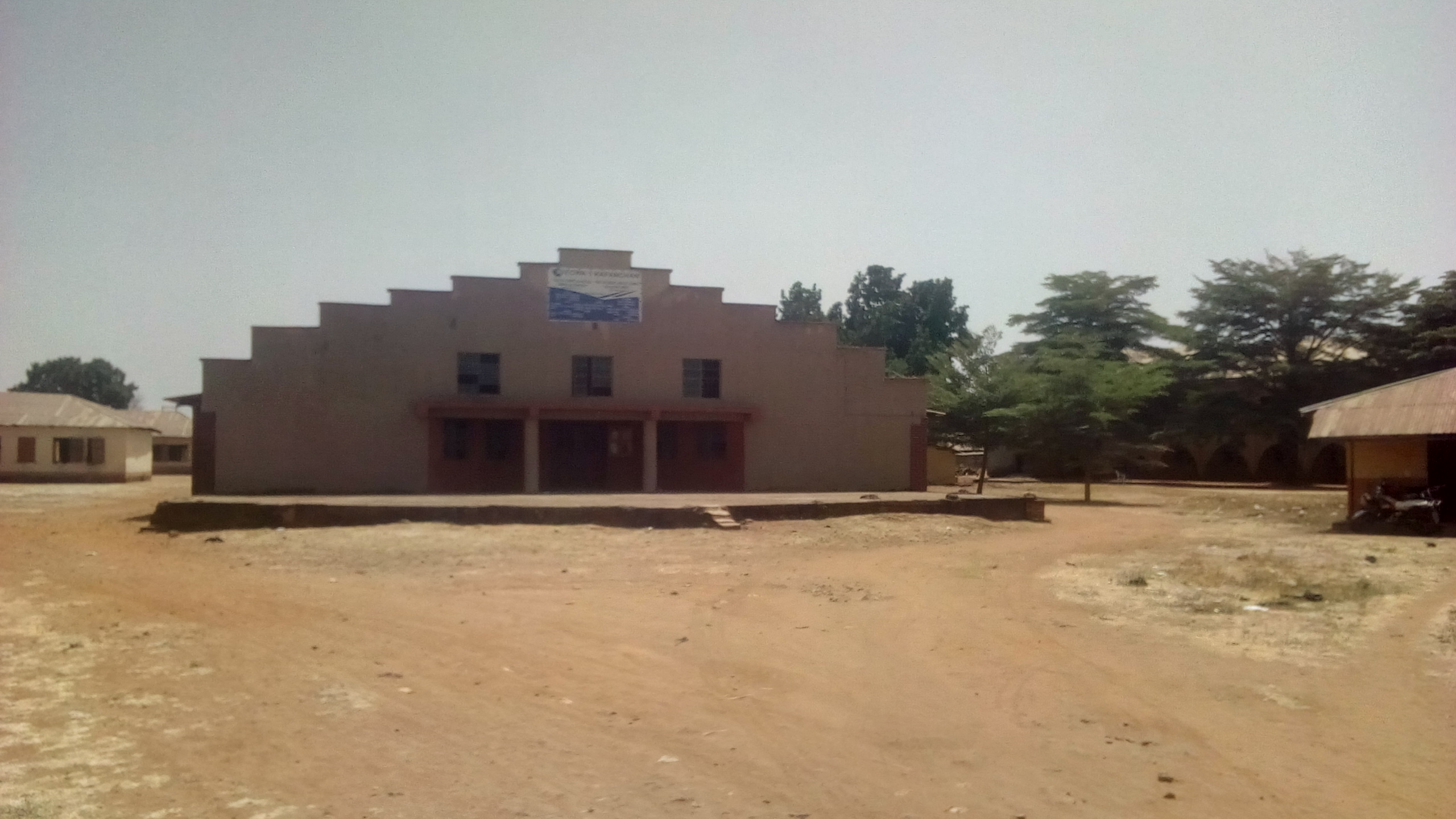
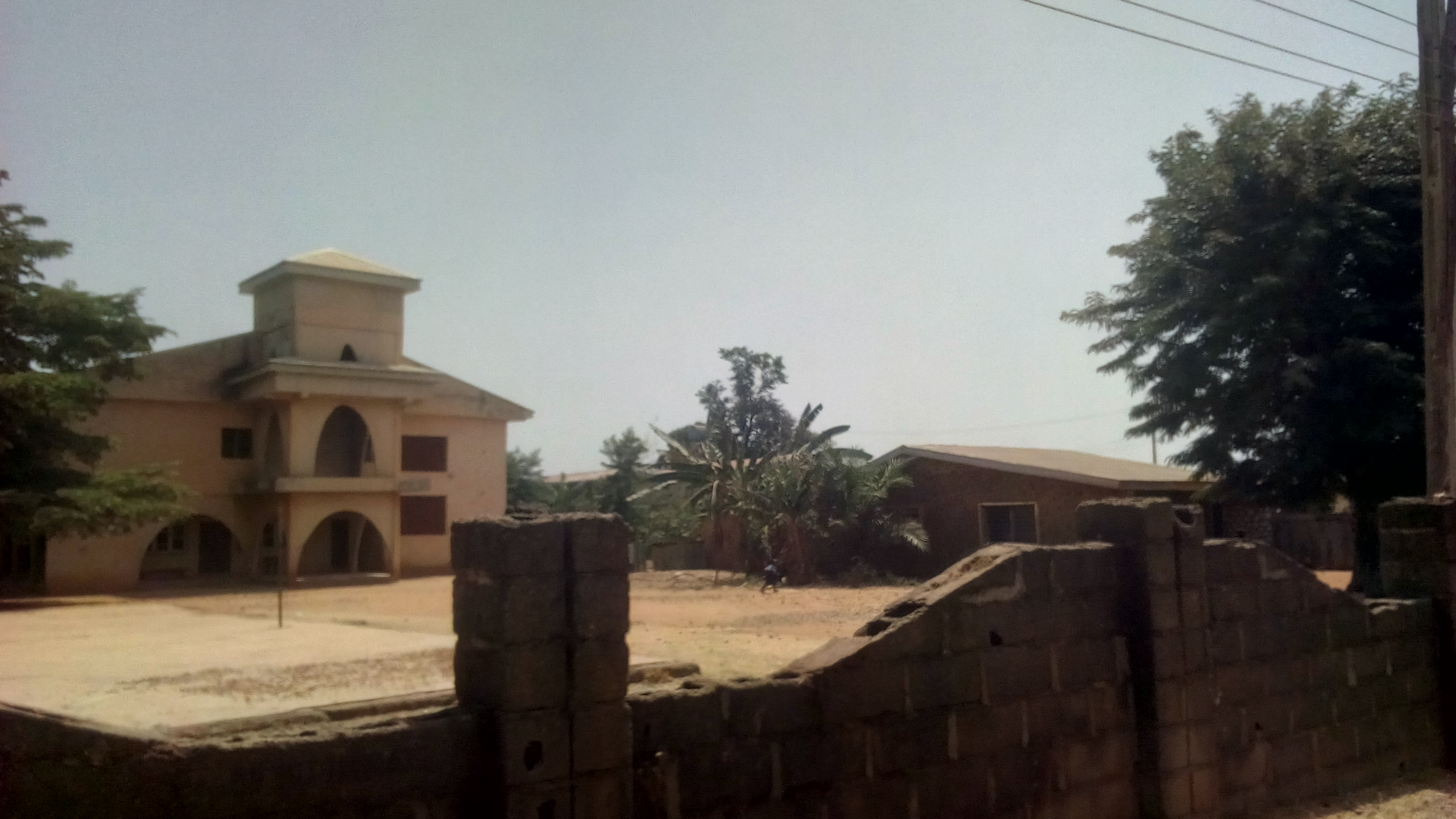
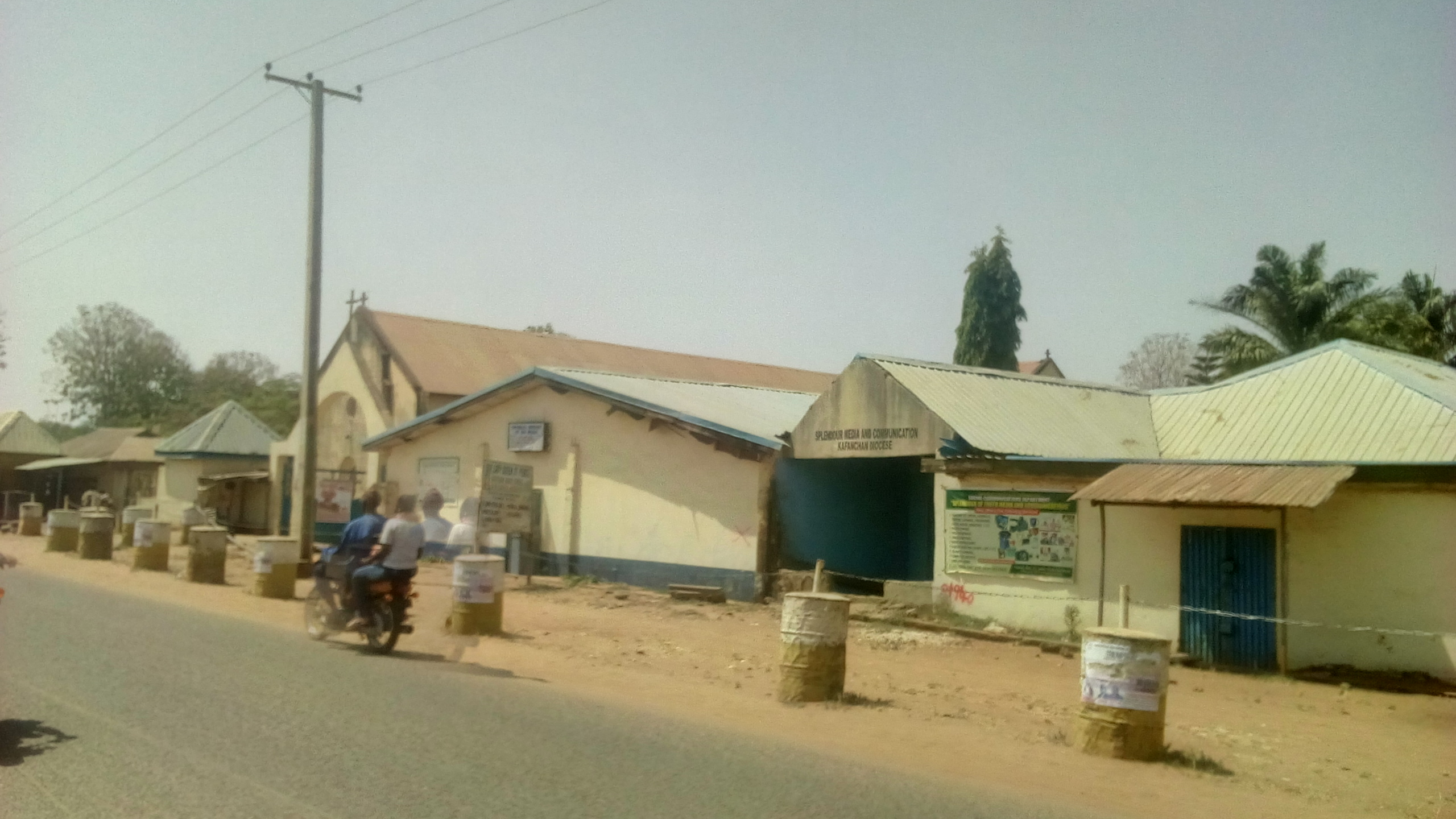
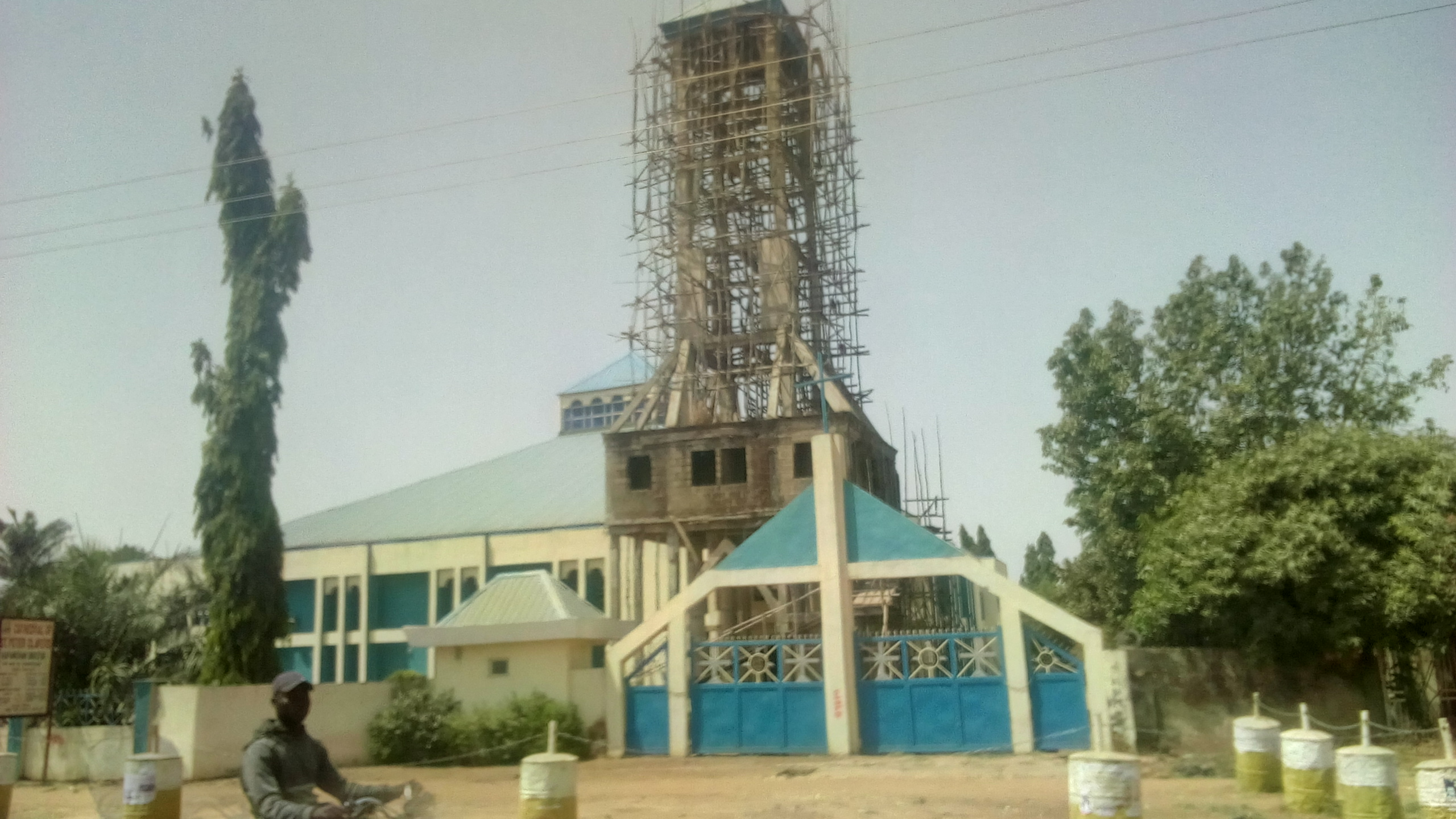
^{From top left clockwise: ECWA 1, ECWA 2, St. Peter's Catholic church, and 1st Catholic church and bookshop buildings}

Today, majority of the Fantswam are Christians. Nevertheless, from time past before accepting Christianity, the Fantswam people had believed in the existence of an omnipotent and Almighty God they call "Gwam-tazwa," (or Gwaza), translatable to "King of Heaven", as narrated the monarch. The people also worshipped the Abwoi/Aboi, in whose rite of passage all males aged 14 year and above were initiated.

In the Fantswam funeral tradition in the ancient times, the deceased were buried regardless of age or gender, immediately after death occurred, but may be kept for up to three days in the modern day. The demise of the aged is celebrated within a longer period among the Fantswam, however, the corpse of a youth or child by traditions, is interred immediately with a short period of mourning to lessen the grief.

=== Fantswam traditional institution ===
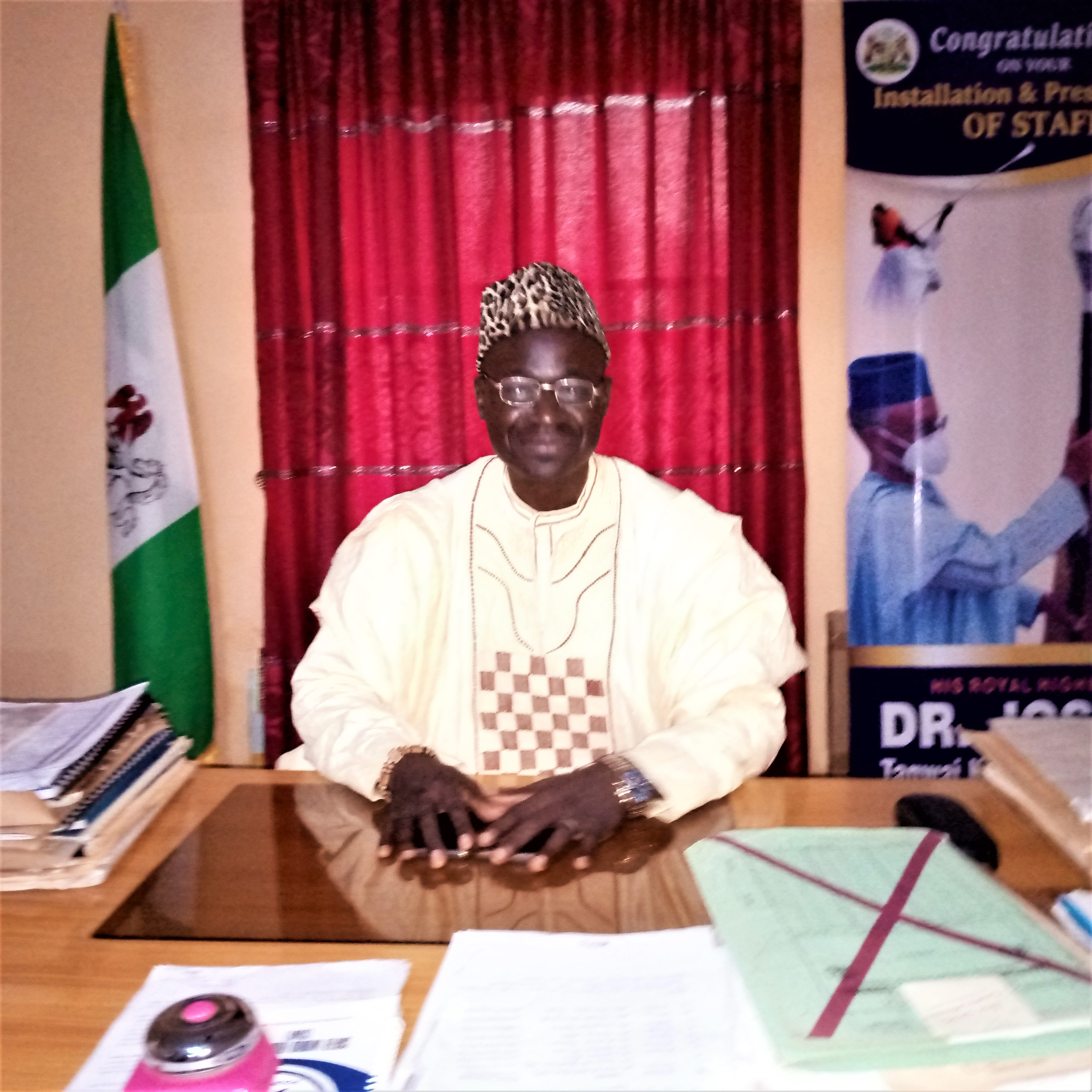
Josiah Kantiyok (Agwam Fantswam II) seated in his office

The monarch (Agwam Fantswam) as of 2021 is Agwam (Dr.) Josiah Kantiyok, Agwam Fantswam II. A sword, considered of great antiquity serves as the instrument of office or symbol of power of the monarch, given by the "Makatanak" (an electoral college consisting of members of a sub-clan of traditional priests of the Fantswam with a spiritual right to initiate a new monarch) after the king-to-be had been identified. Sun Travels reported palace sources in Zikpak, stating that no member of the Makatanak was permitted to aspire to the throne of the Agwam's, which serves as a check and balance mechanism.

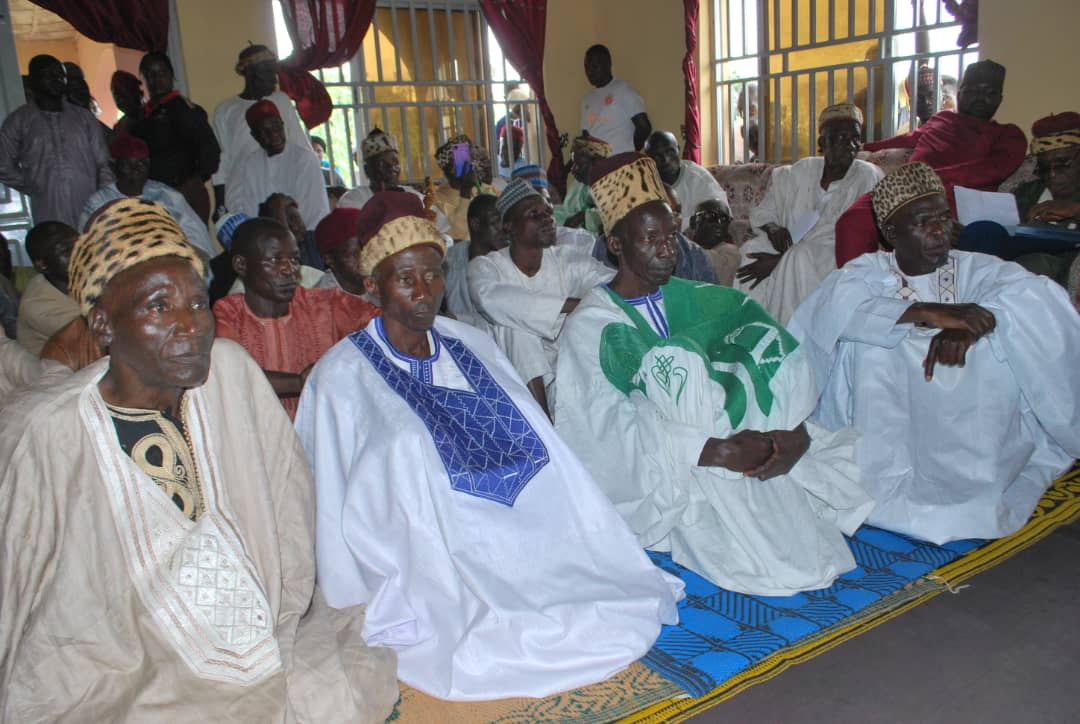
Capping ceremony of representatives from four of the five ruling houses: Manyii, Takau, Takum and Zibyin on Saturday, 16 October 2021, by the A̱gwam Fantswam II

The Fantswam (Kafanchan) chiefdom comprises five ruling houses, namely: Manyii, Takau, Takum, Zibyin (Kajibyin) and Zikpak. There are six District Heads, seven districts and 32 Village Heads.

The Fantswam in the pre-colonial times were said to have fallen under Kauru/Kajuru rule. Under Kauru, there were at least five chiefs, namely: Yabiliyok, Dodo Jinjirim, Kadong Manza, Abwui Duniya and Dari.

=== Traditional stools ===
There are three traditional stools present within Kafanchan town, recognised by the state government. These include the Fantswam, Nikyob-Nindem and Hausa-Fulani stools held by:

- A̱gwam (Dr.) Josiah Tagwai Kantiyok (A̱gwam Fantswam II)
- Tum Tanko Tete (Tum Nikyob)
- Alhaji Muhammadu Isa Muhammadu OFR (Emir of Jama'a AKA "Sarkin Hausawa" i.e. "King of the Hausas")

There are also the stools of the Eze Ndi-Igbo of the Igbo people and Oba of Yoruba in Kafanchan.

== Infrastructure ==
The town has several public educational institutions including primary, secondary and tertiary schools, a High court, a Magistrates' court, police stations, multiple commercial bank buildings, a branch station of the Nigerian Television Authority (NTA), a General Hospital (Sir Patrick Ibrahim Yakowa Memorial Hospital). The town also houses the headquarters of a Christian ministry, Throneroom (Trust) Ministry.

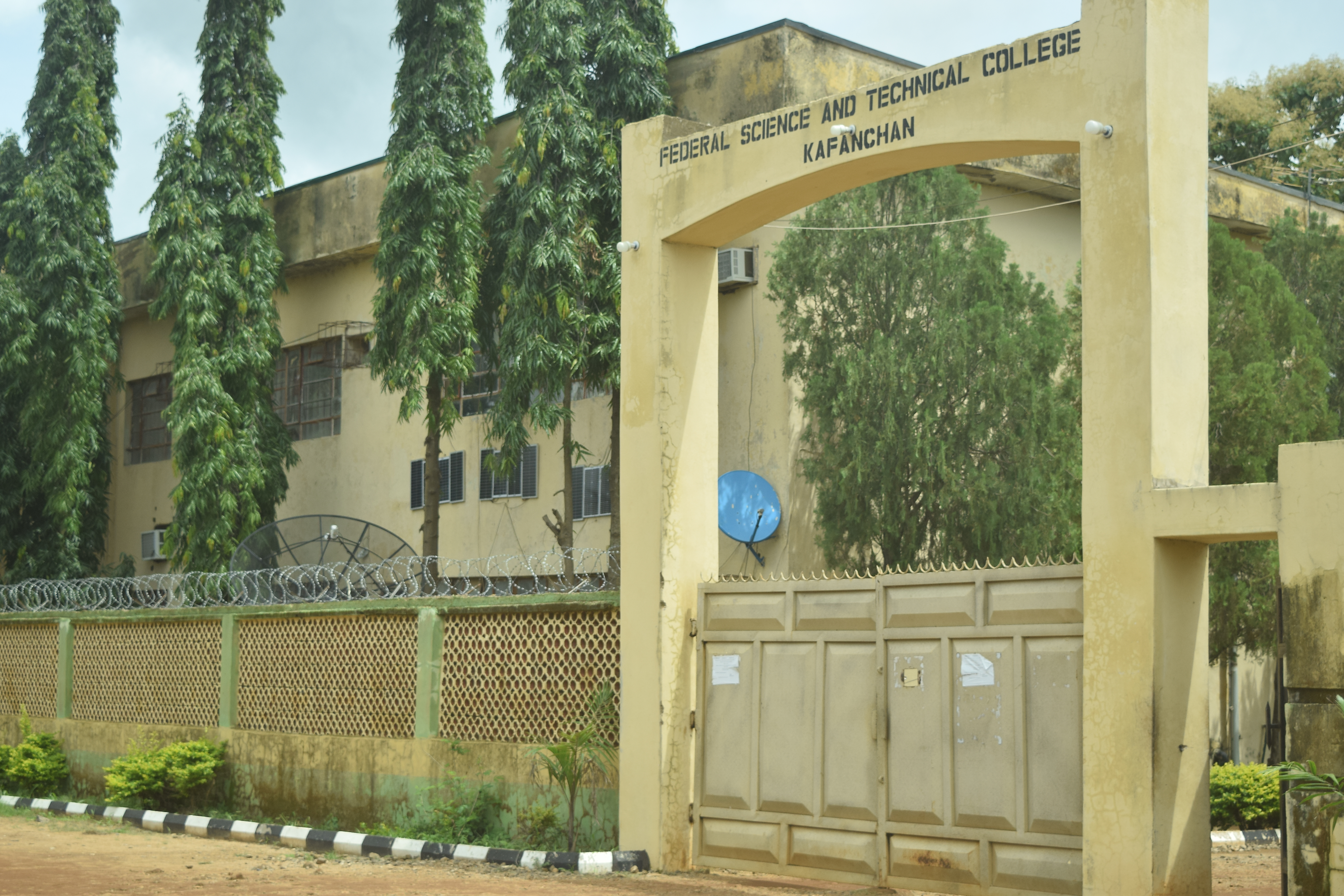
Main Entrance, Federal Science and Technical College (FSTC), Garaje, Kafanchan, Nigeria

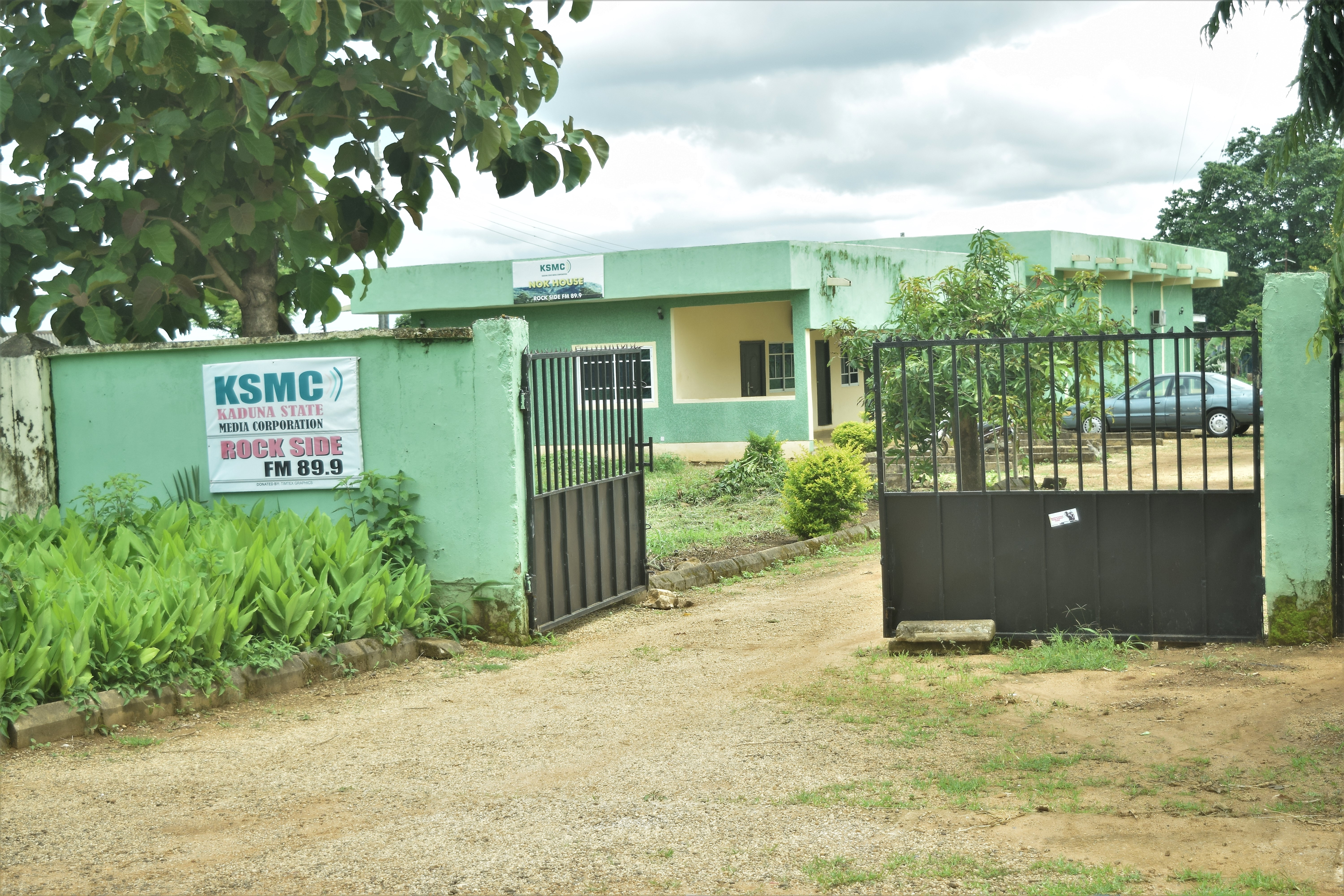
Gate, Rockside FM building, Kafanchan, Nigeria

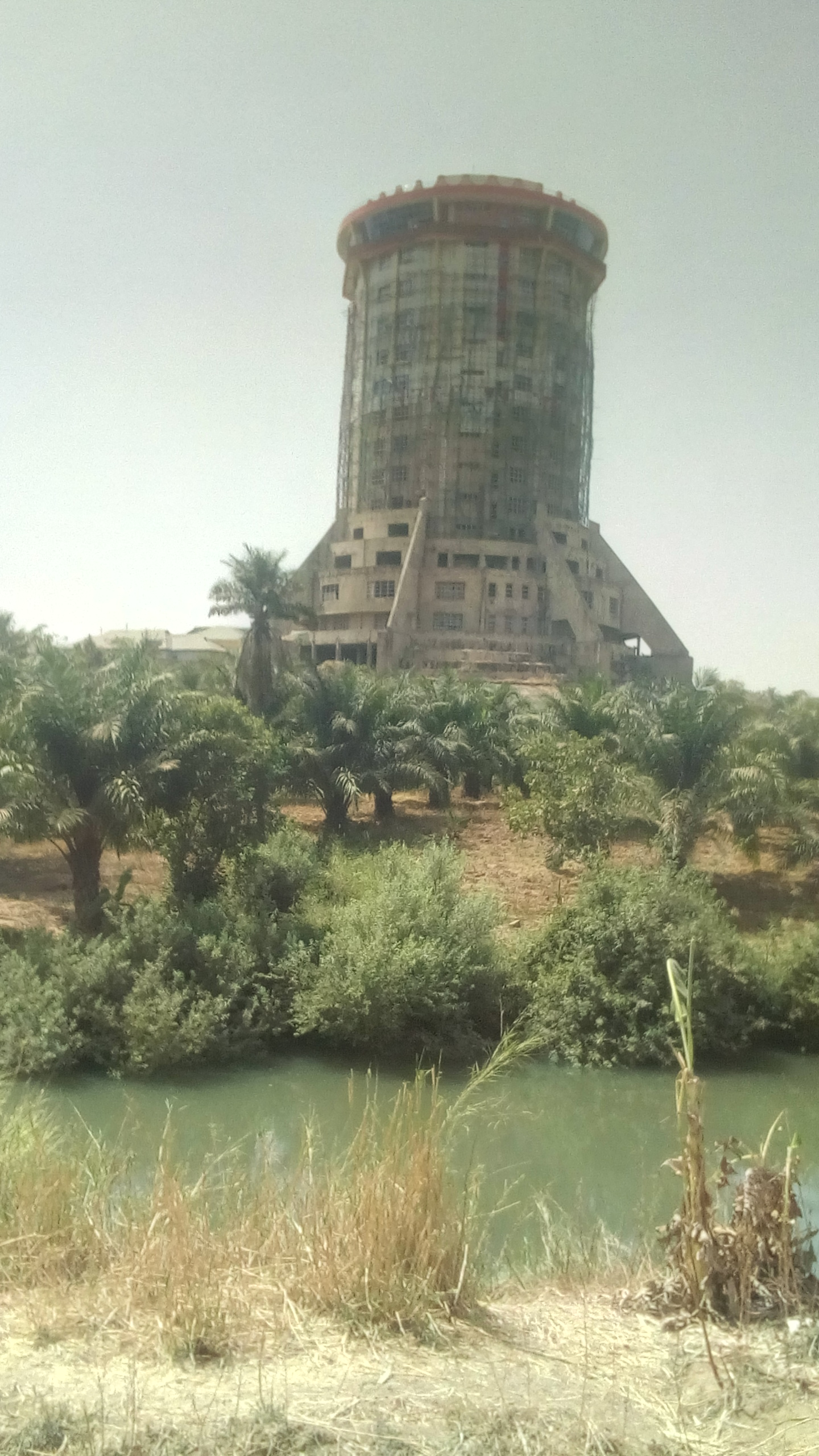
Kaduna State's Salama Radio 14-storey building under construction by Throneroom (Trust) Ministry

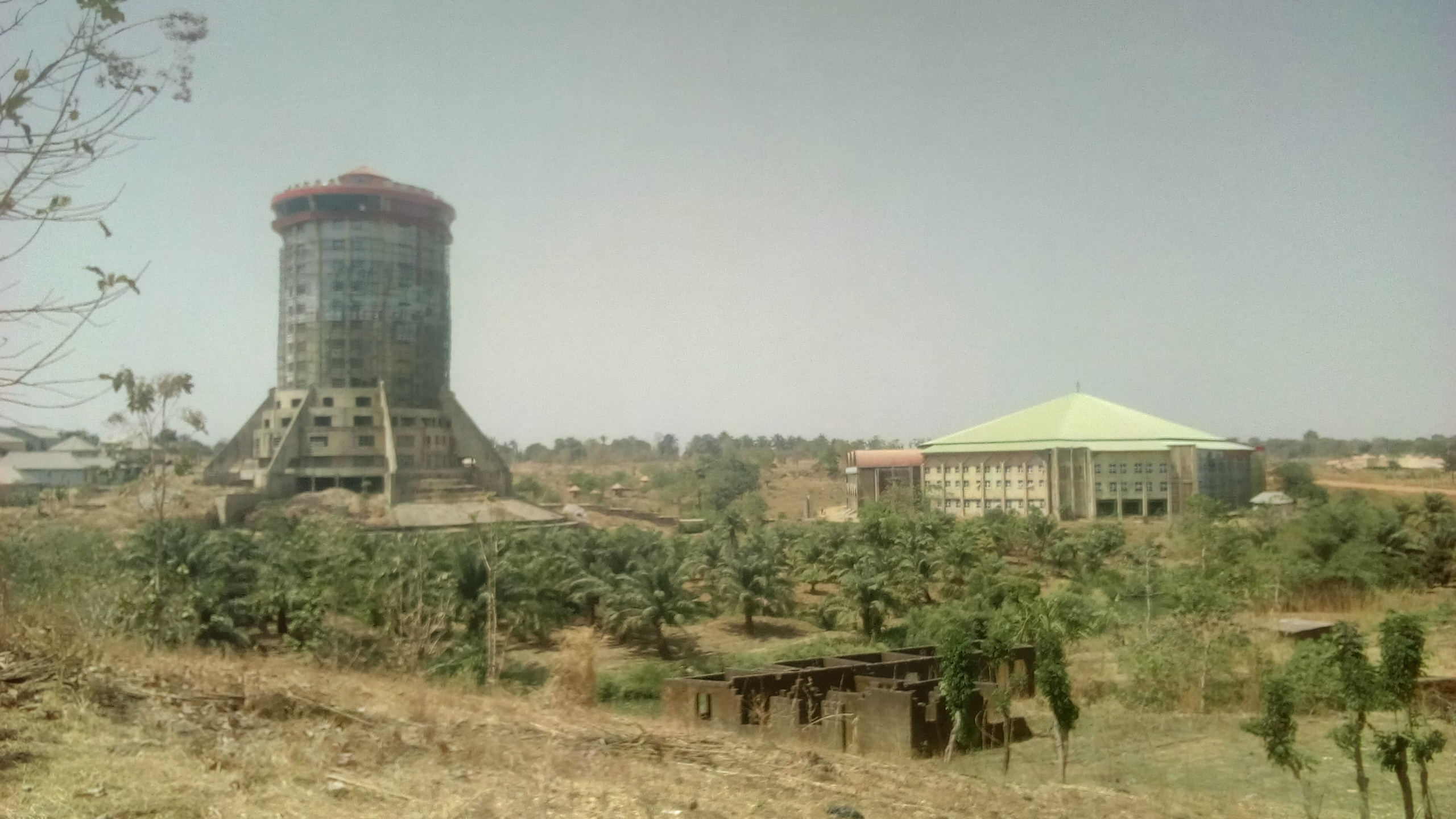
Throneroom Kafanchan new site sideview taken from across the adhacent small river

=== Transportation ===
==== Railway ====
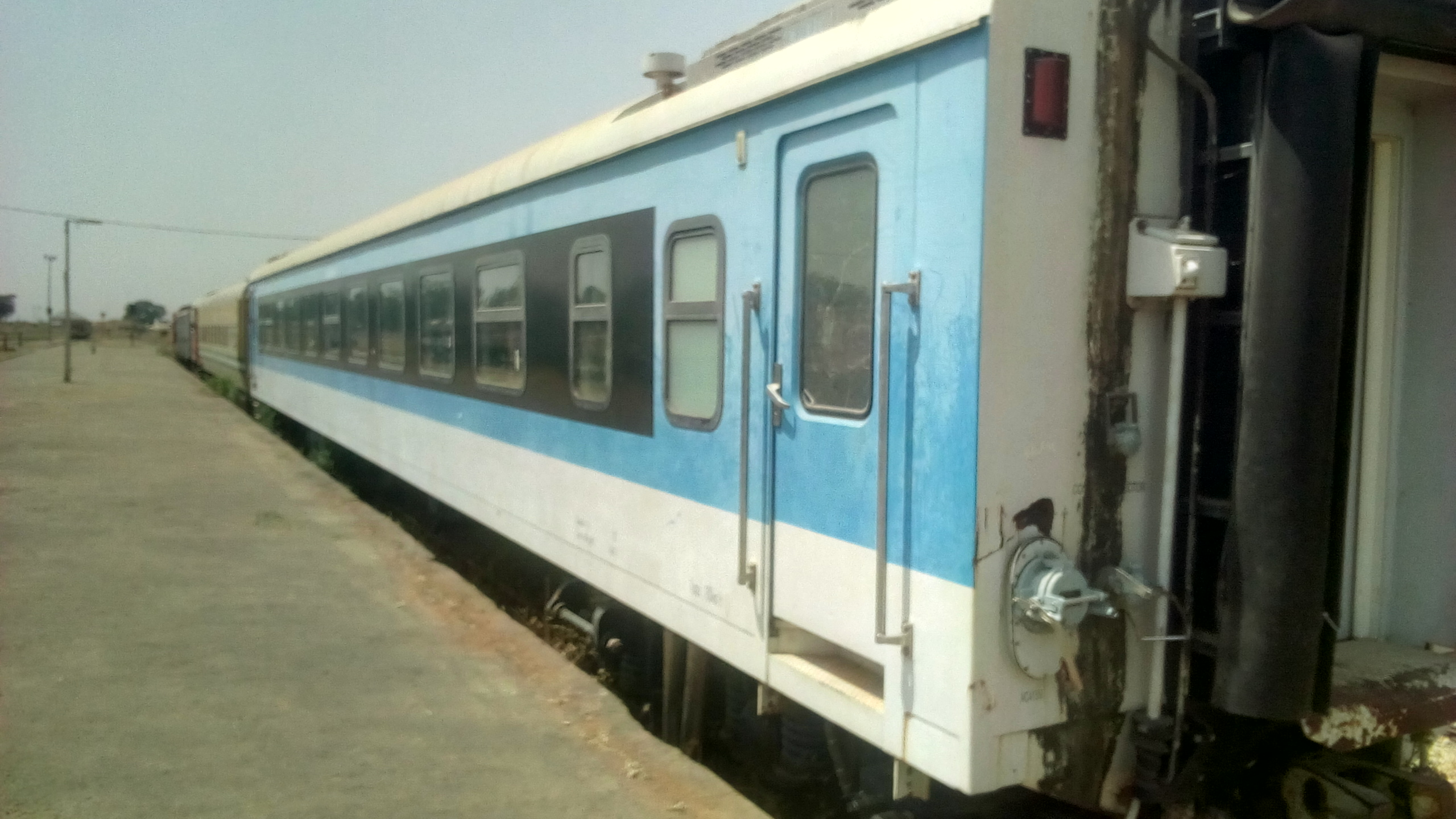

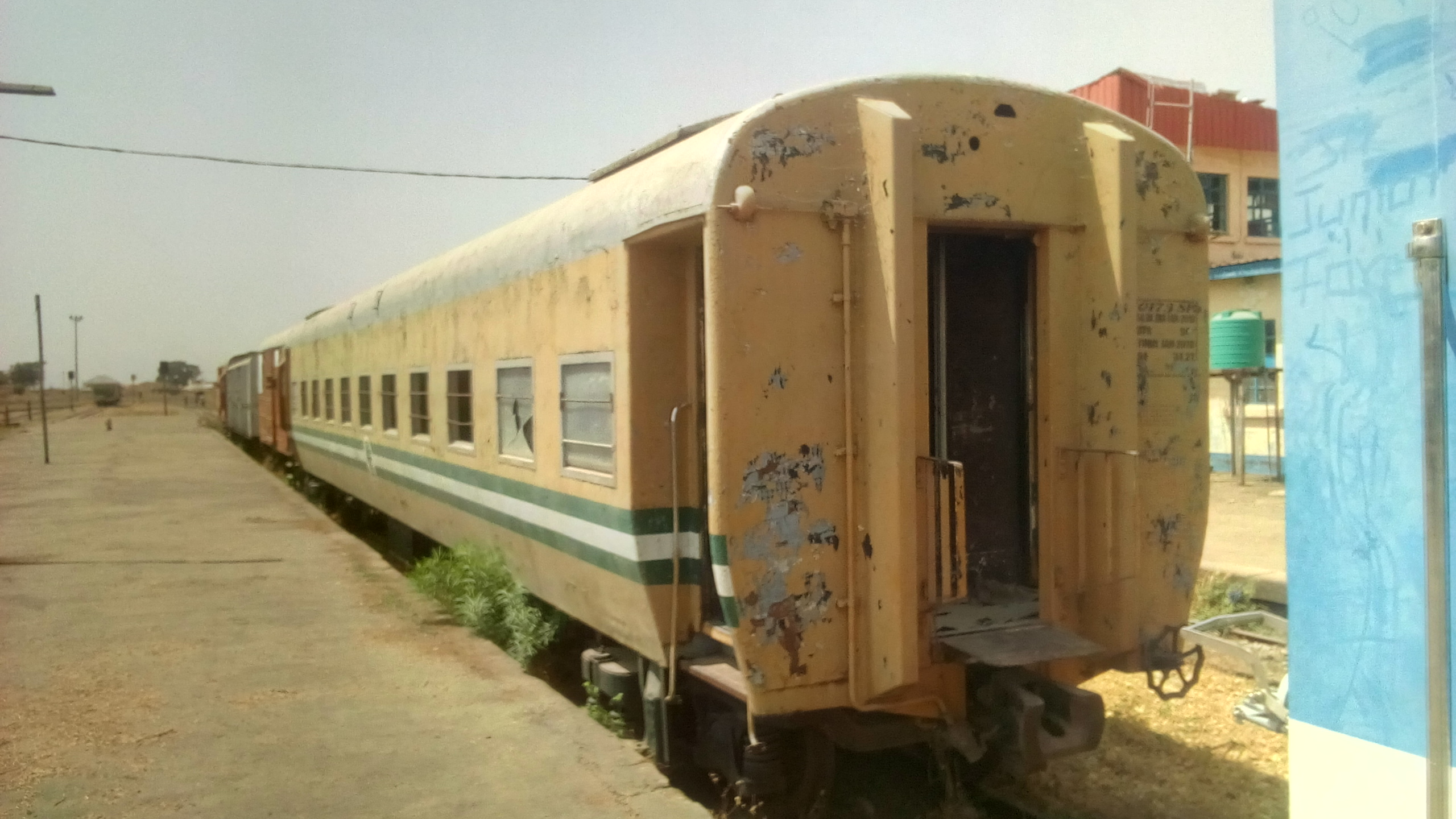
Two trains at the Kafanchan railway station

Kafanchan's railway station is the headquarters of one of the Nigerian Railway Corporation (NRC) seven national districts and hubs, the North Central District, comprising states such as Benue, Kaduna, Nasarawa and Plateau States, whose rail network links Nigeria's south and north.

The town lies at the middle of a railway line connecting Port Harcourt, Enugu, Kafanchan, Kuru, Bauchi, and finally Maiduguri.

==== Air ====
The closest airport to the town is the Yakubu Gowon Airport (IATA: JOS), Jos.

==== Roads ====
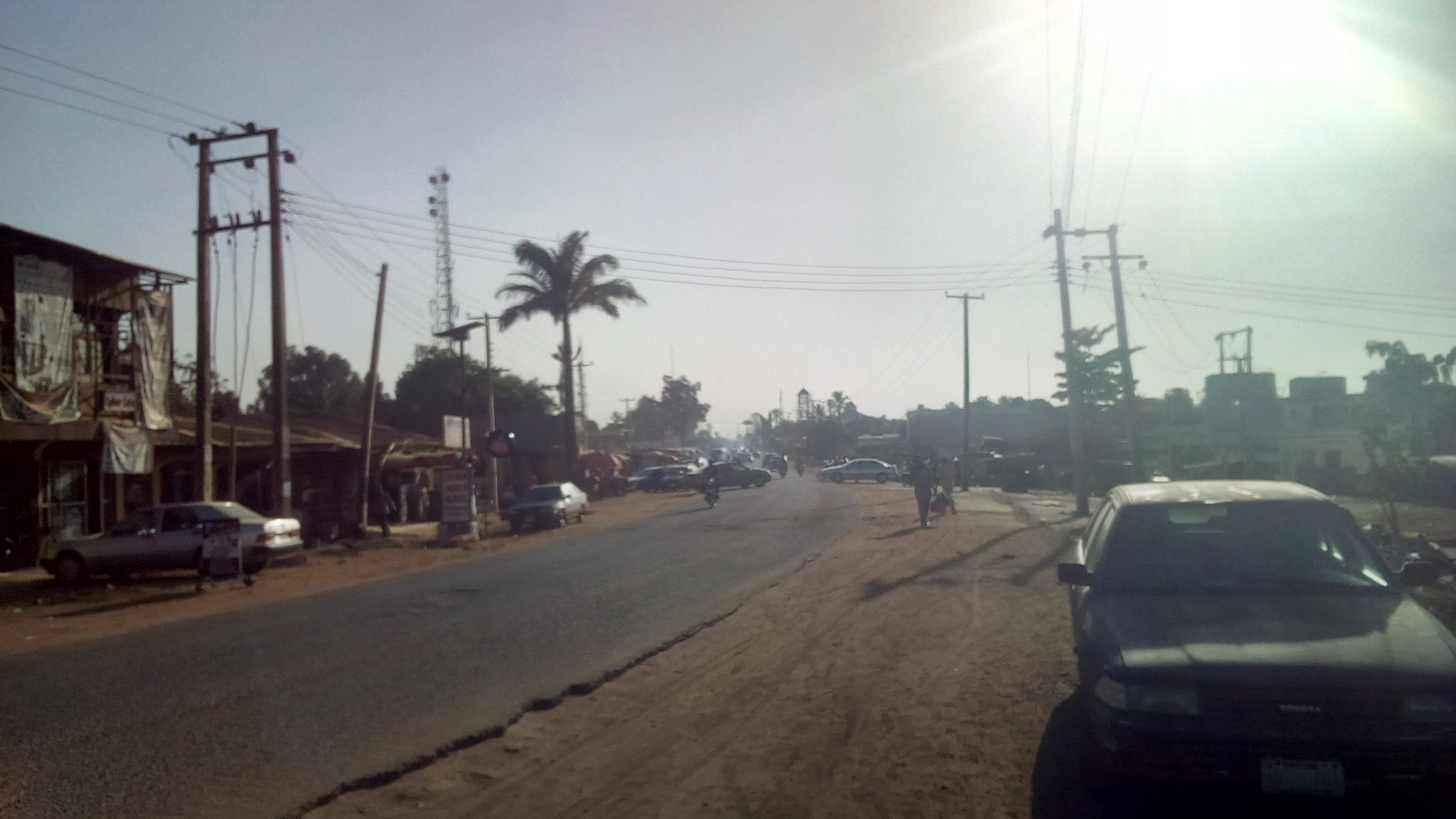
Kafanchan-Kagoro road by New World Motel, Kafanchan

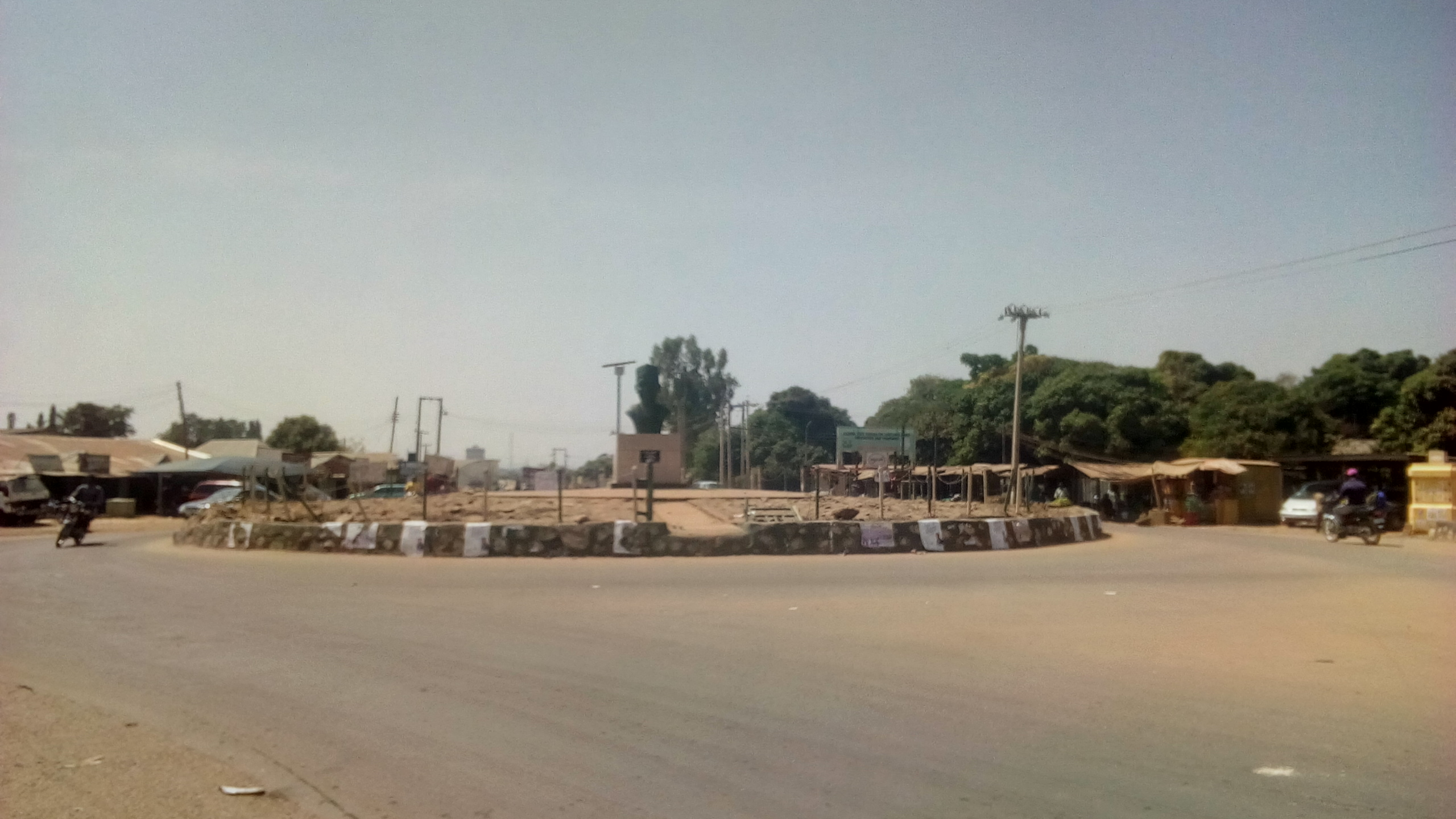
NEPA Roundabout connecting Kafanchan to Kagoro (Gworok) and Madakiya (Batadon)

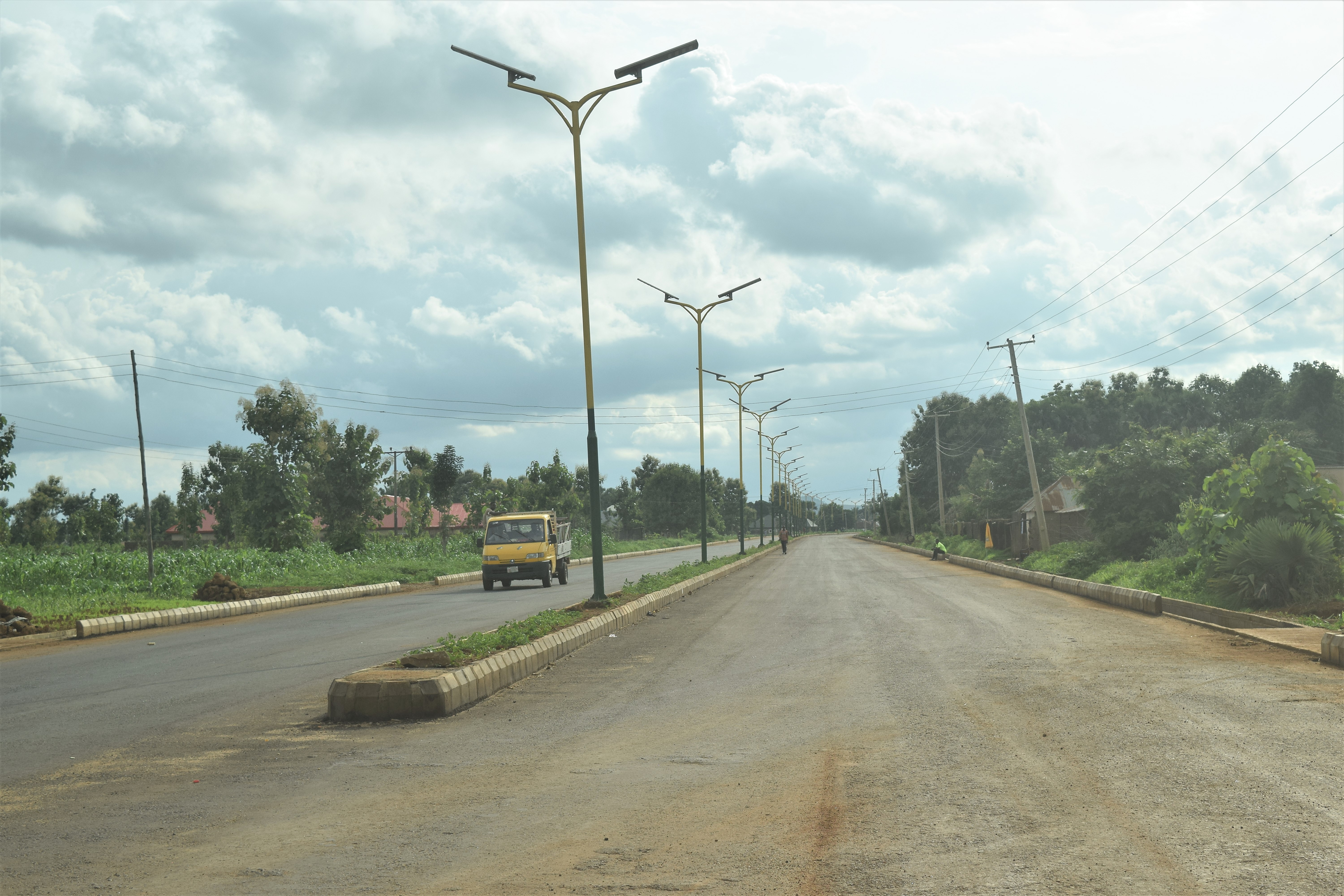
Double lane part, Kafanchan-Kagoma-Kwoi road

=== Sports ===
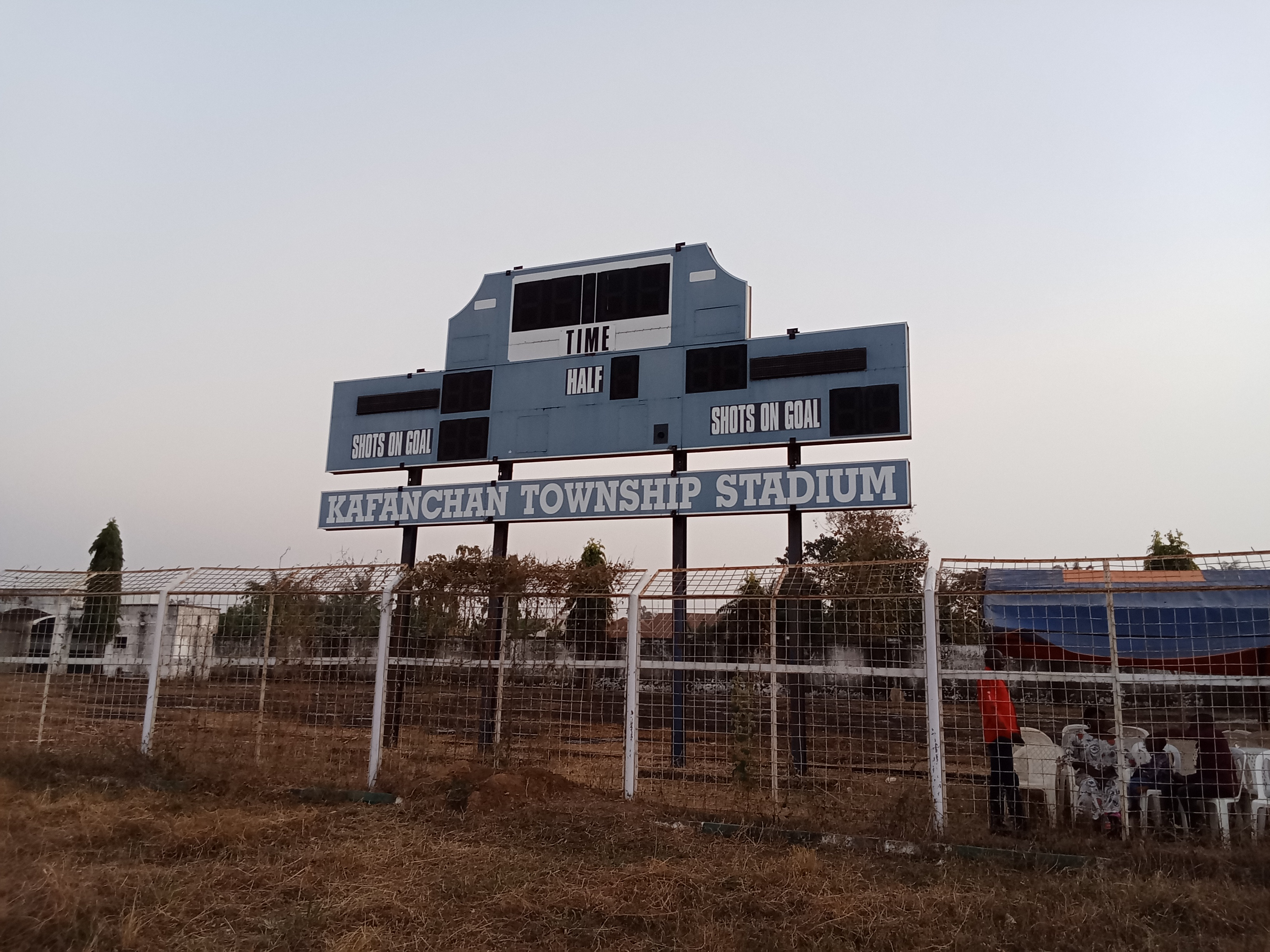
Notification board, Kafanchan township stadium.

Kafanchan has a township stadium, located in its Takum district.

== Education ==
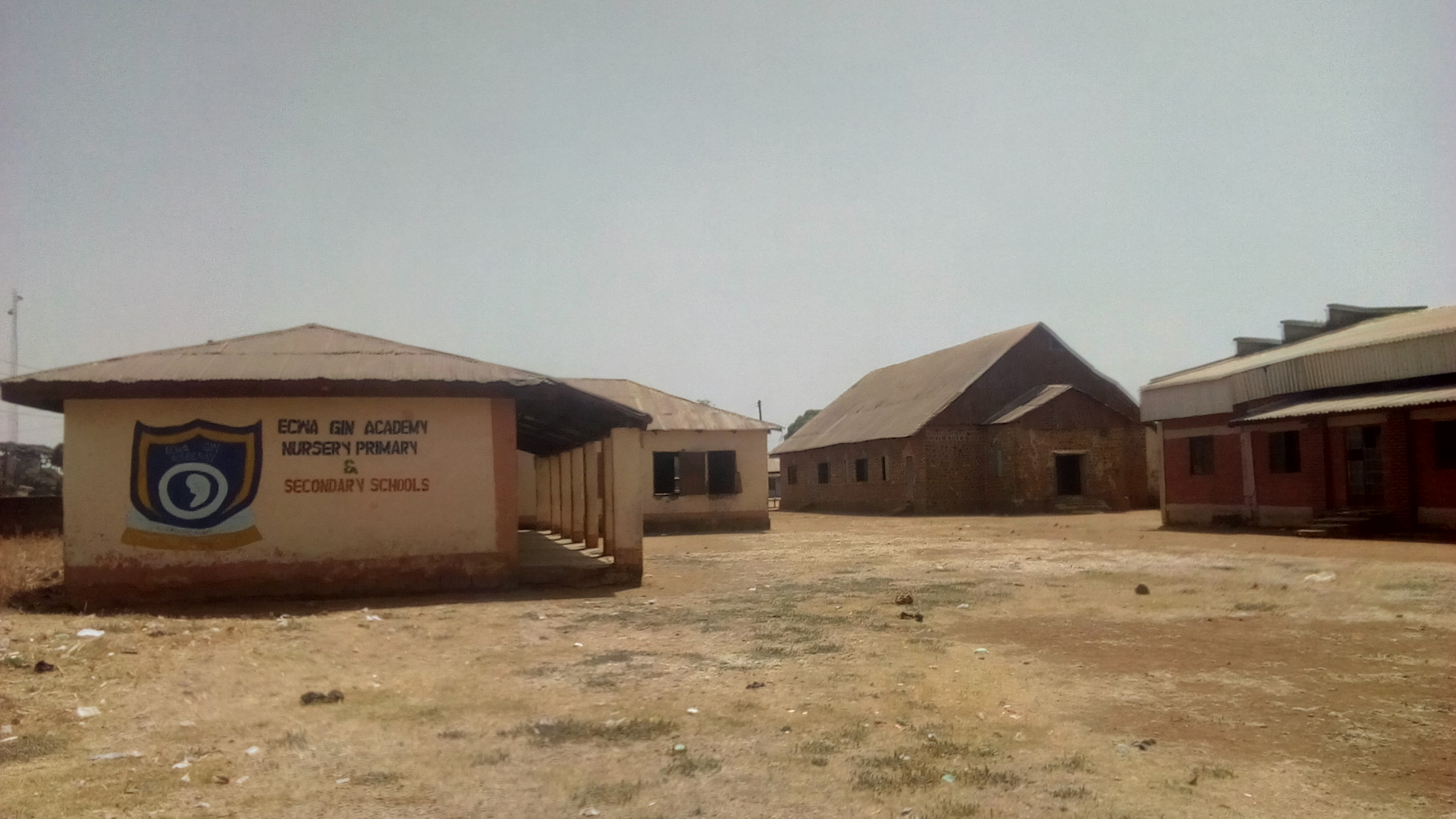
ECWA Gin Academy Schools, Kafanchan

The earliest educational institutions in the town include: the Evangelical Church Winning All (ECWA) Gin School, formerly Sudan Interior Mission (SIM) School; and the Roman Catholic Mission (RCM) School, New Saint Peter Claviers.

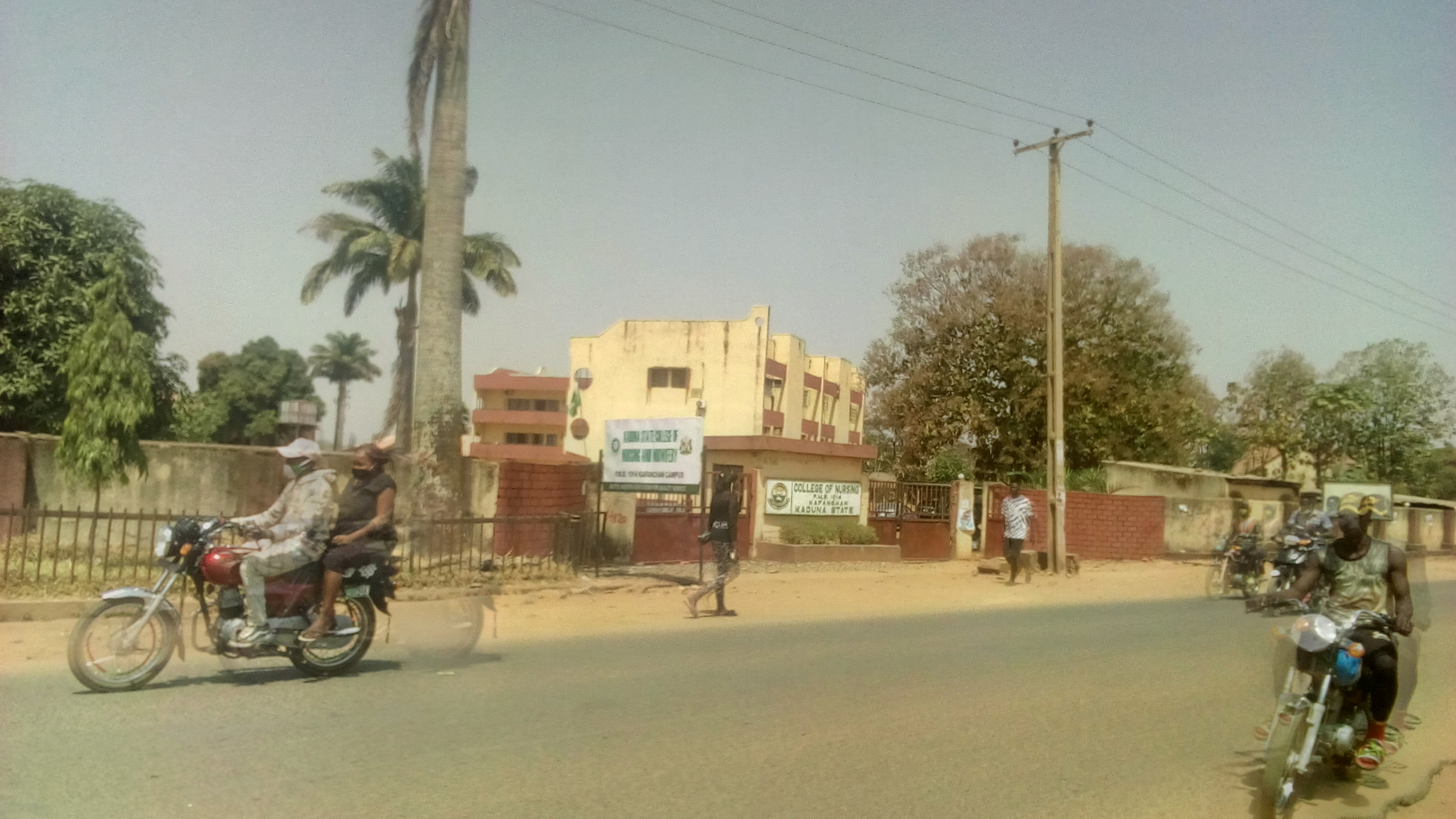
Kaduna State College of Nursing and Midwifery, Kafanchan

As of 2007, Kafanchan housed public educational institutions in the state such as: Kaduna State University (KASU), Kafanchan Campus; Kaduna State College of Education (KSCOE), Gidan Waya; Kaduna State College of Nursing and Midwifery; a Federal Science and Technical College; and at least eight primary schools.

== Economy ==
=== Commerce ===
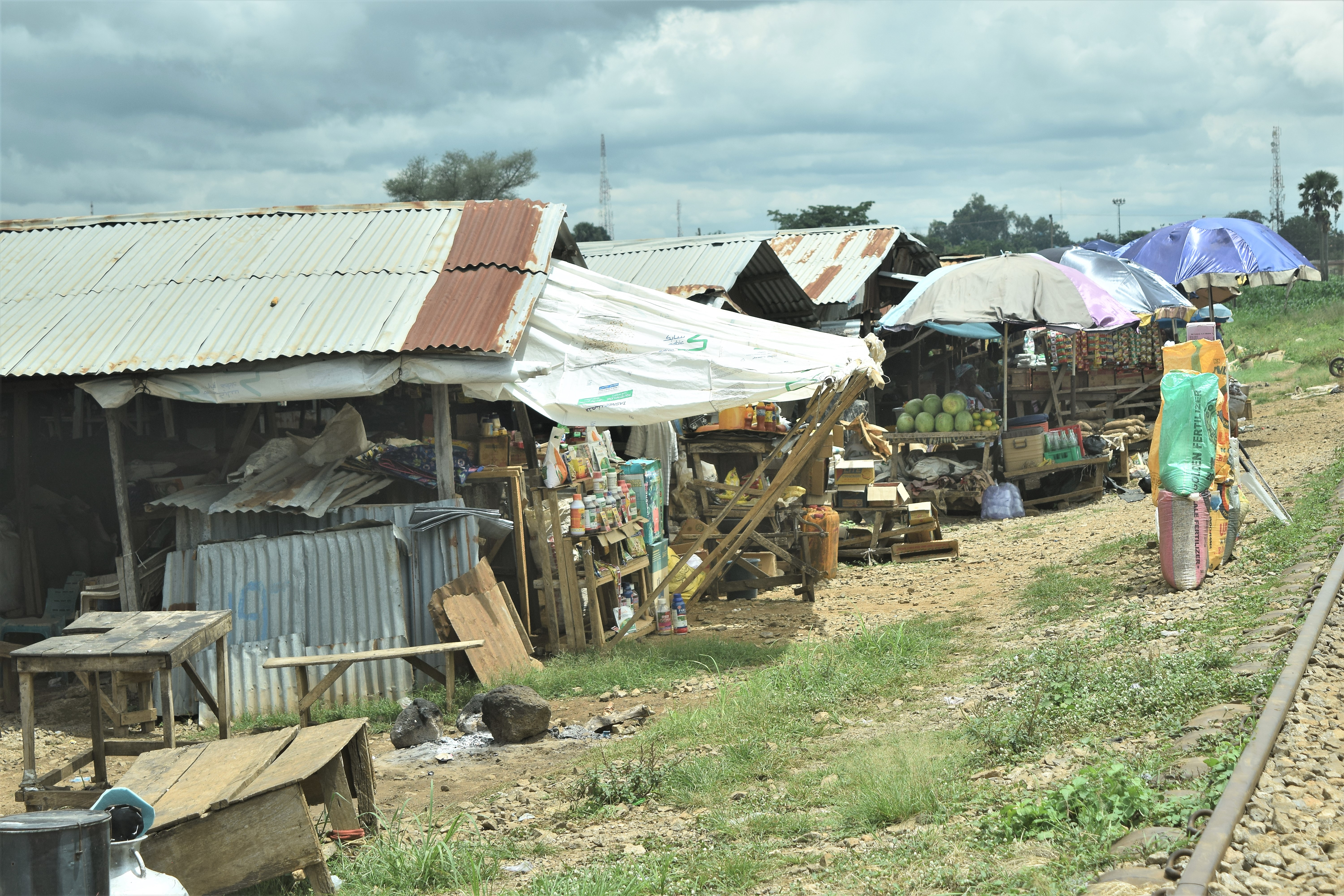
Commercial activities at Yakowa Main Market

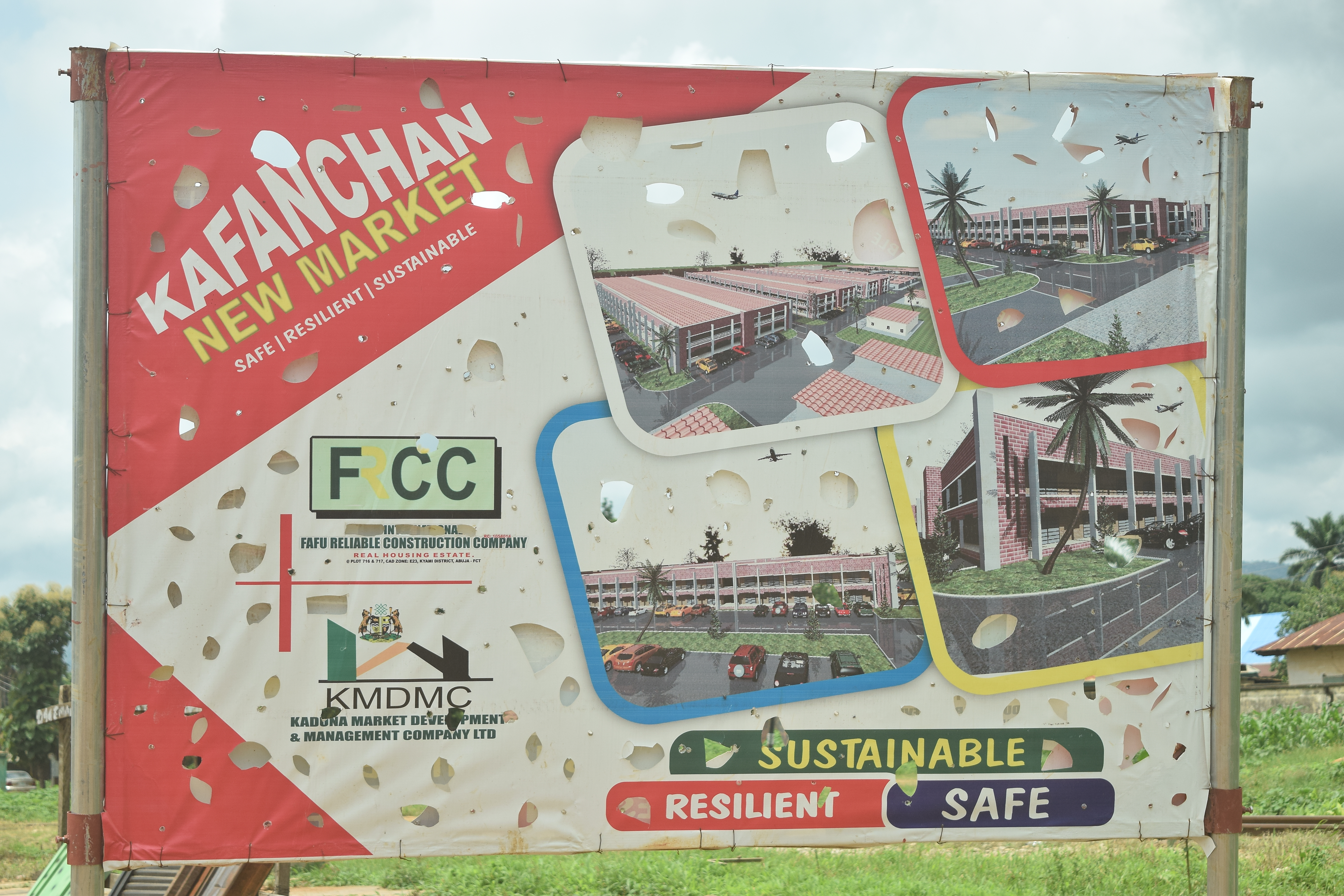
Signpost, Kafanchan New Market (Yakowa Main Market)

The town has two main markets. The old market site located in the heart of the town and the new market, Yakowa Main Market (the proposed Kafanchan New Market), along the Kafanchan-Kagoro road.

=== Train services ===
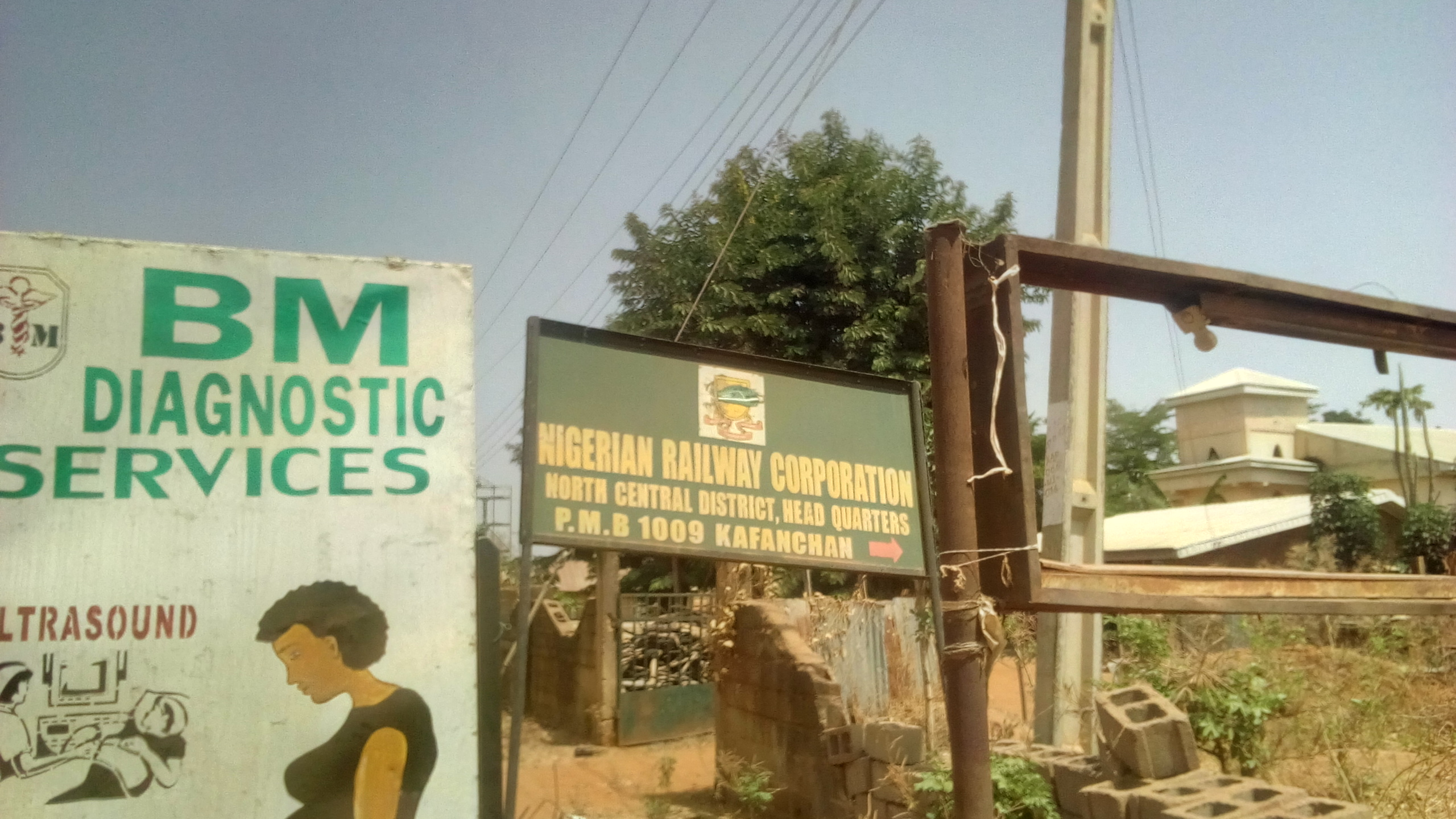
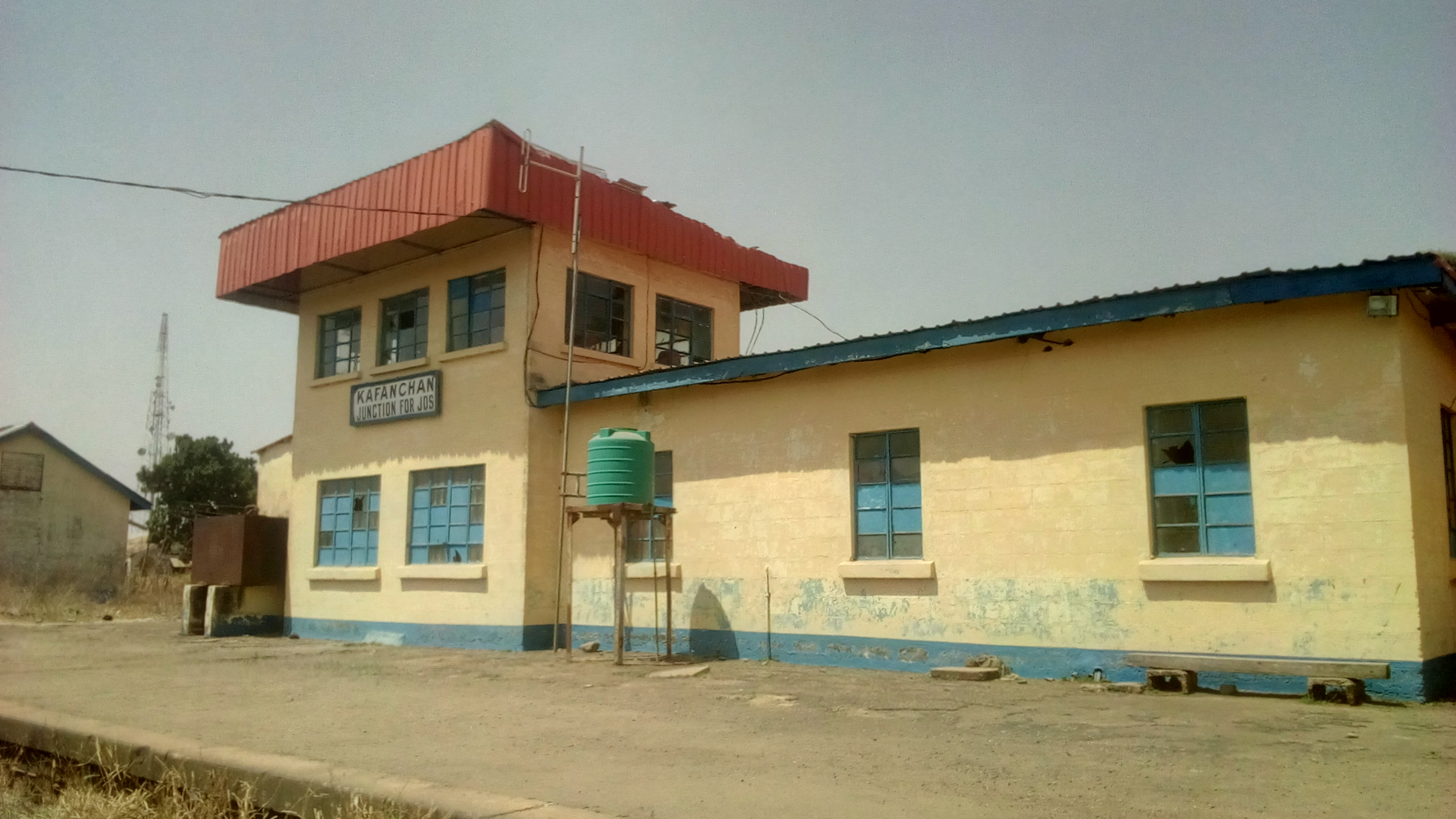
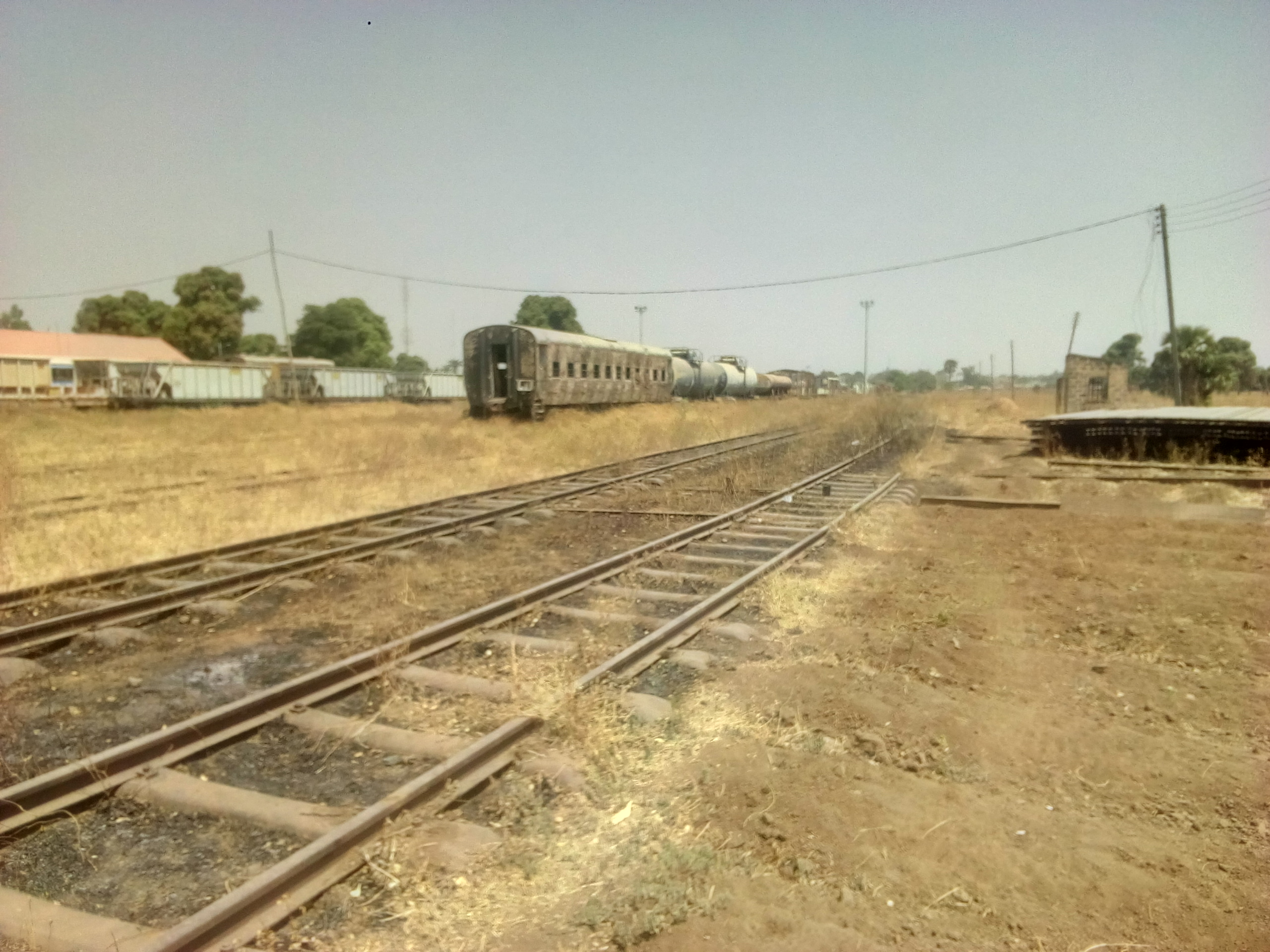
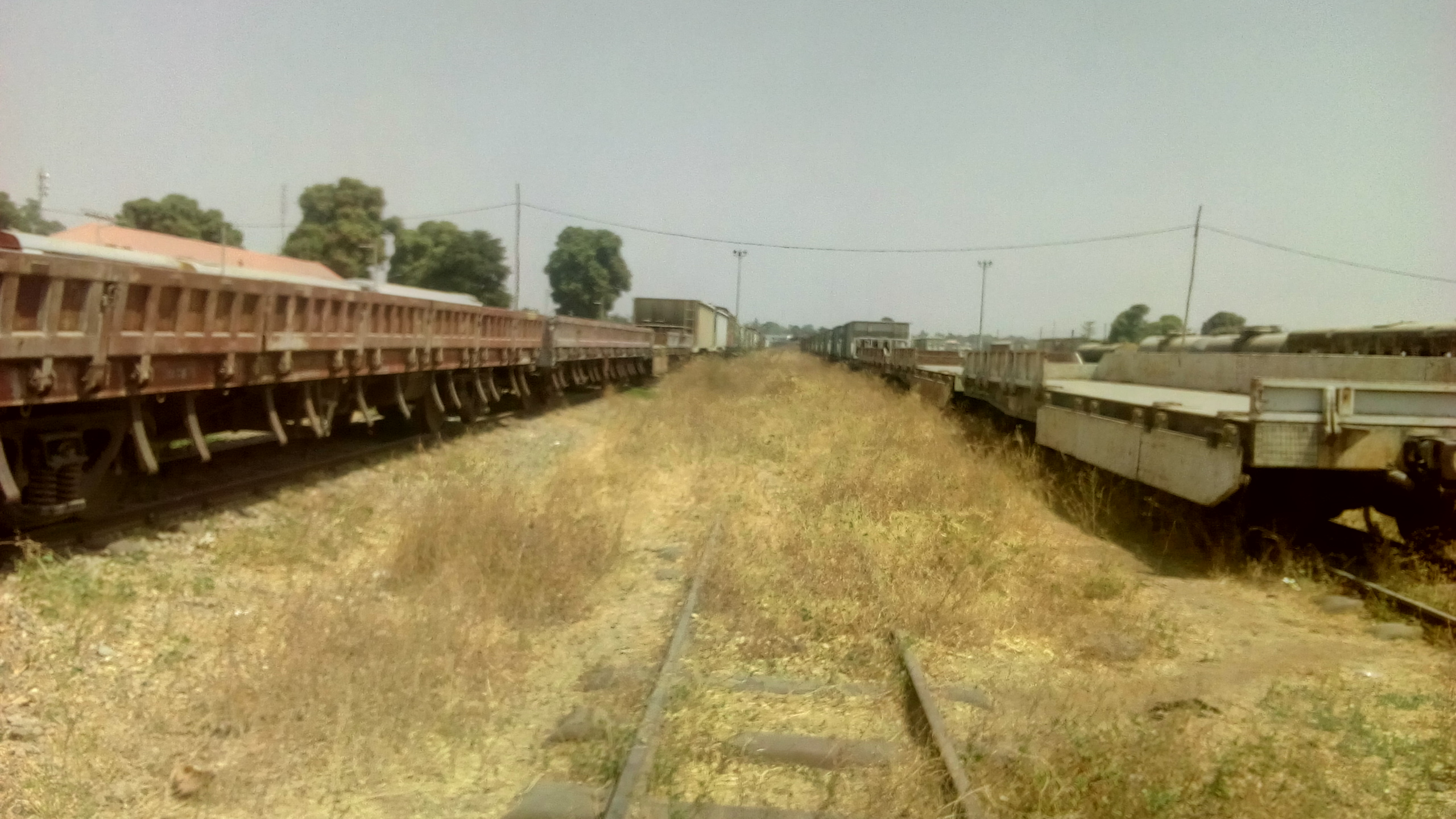
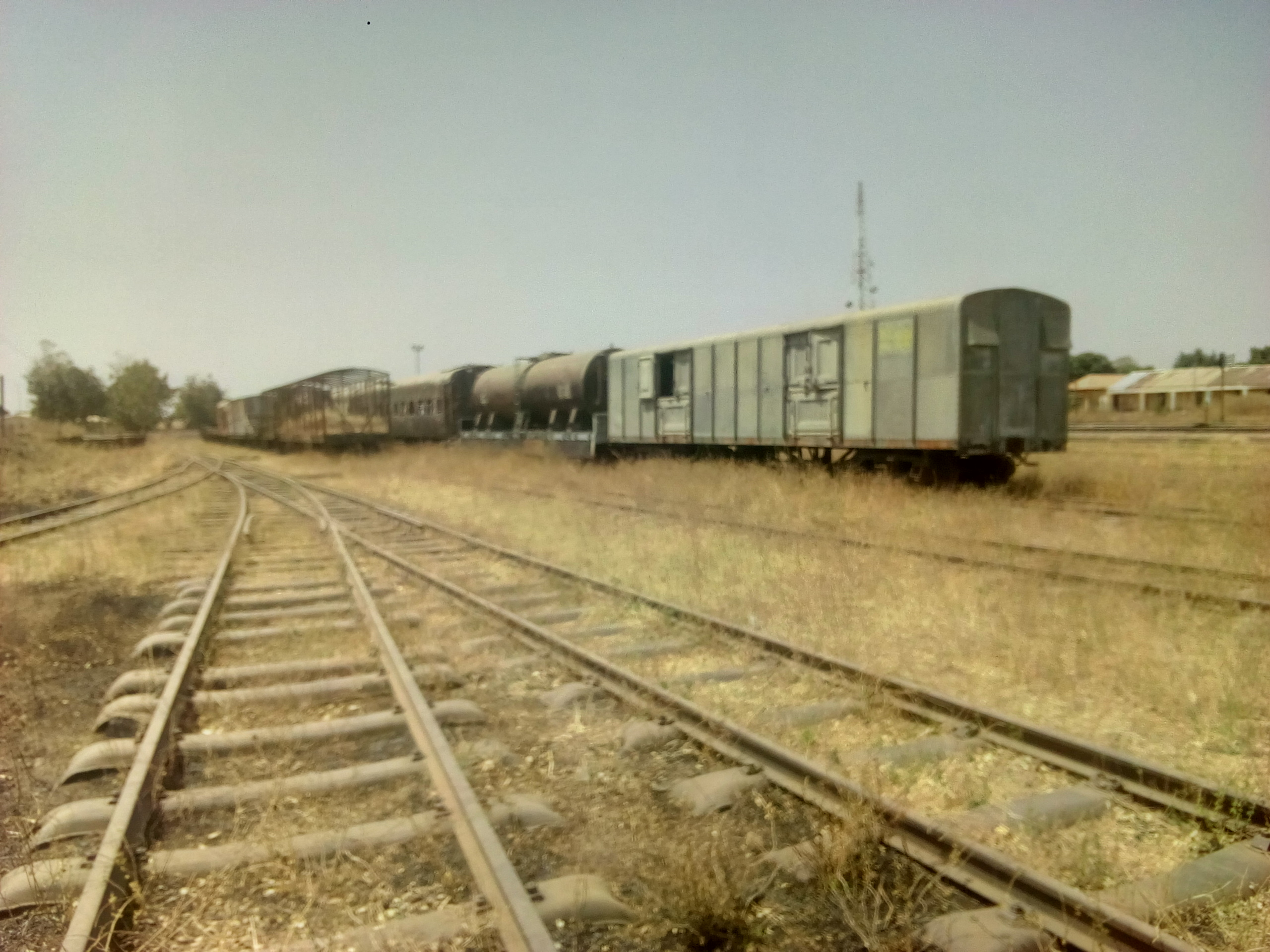
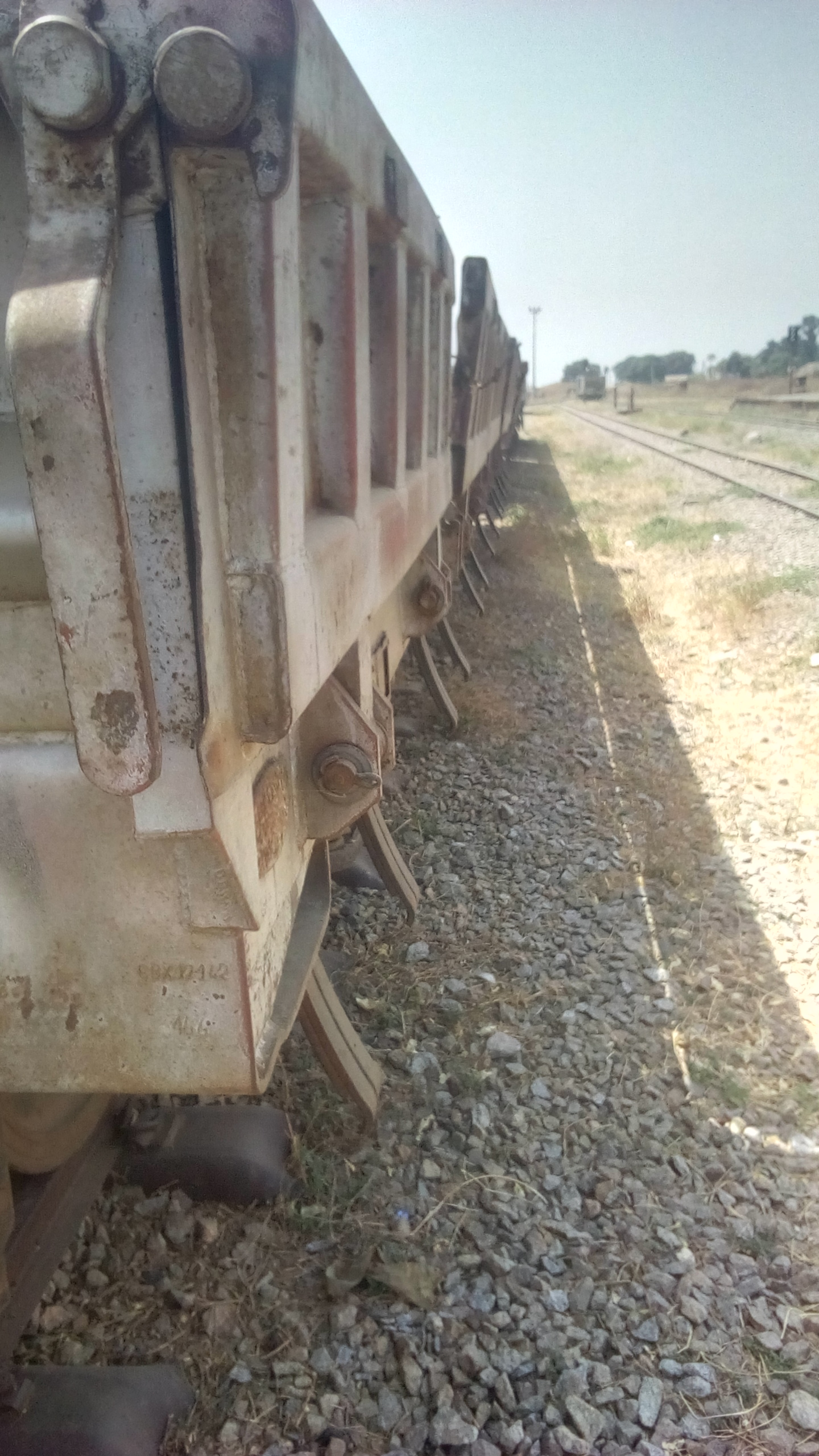
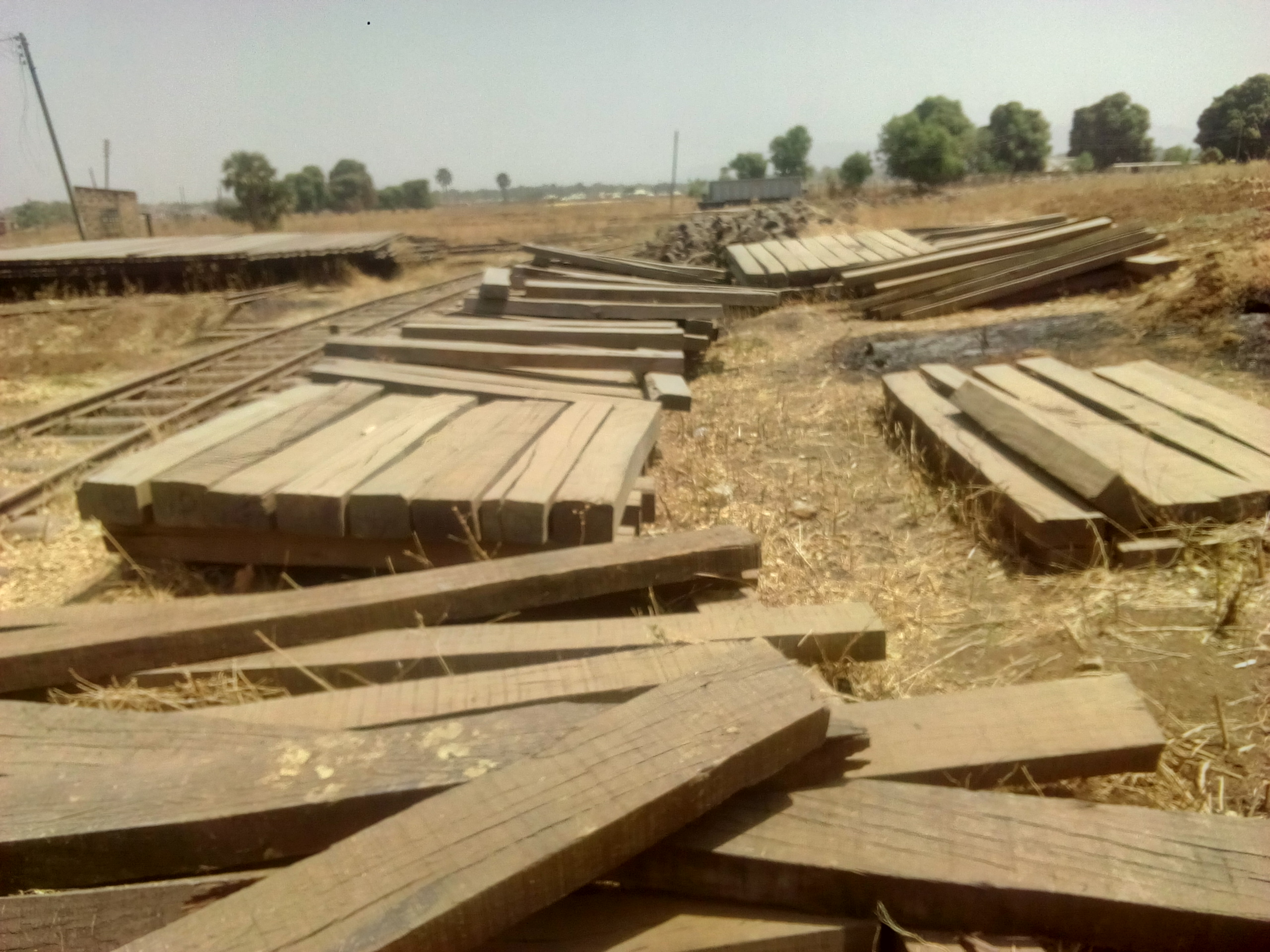
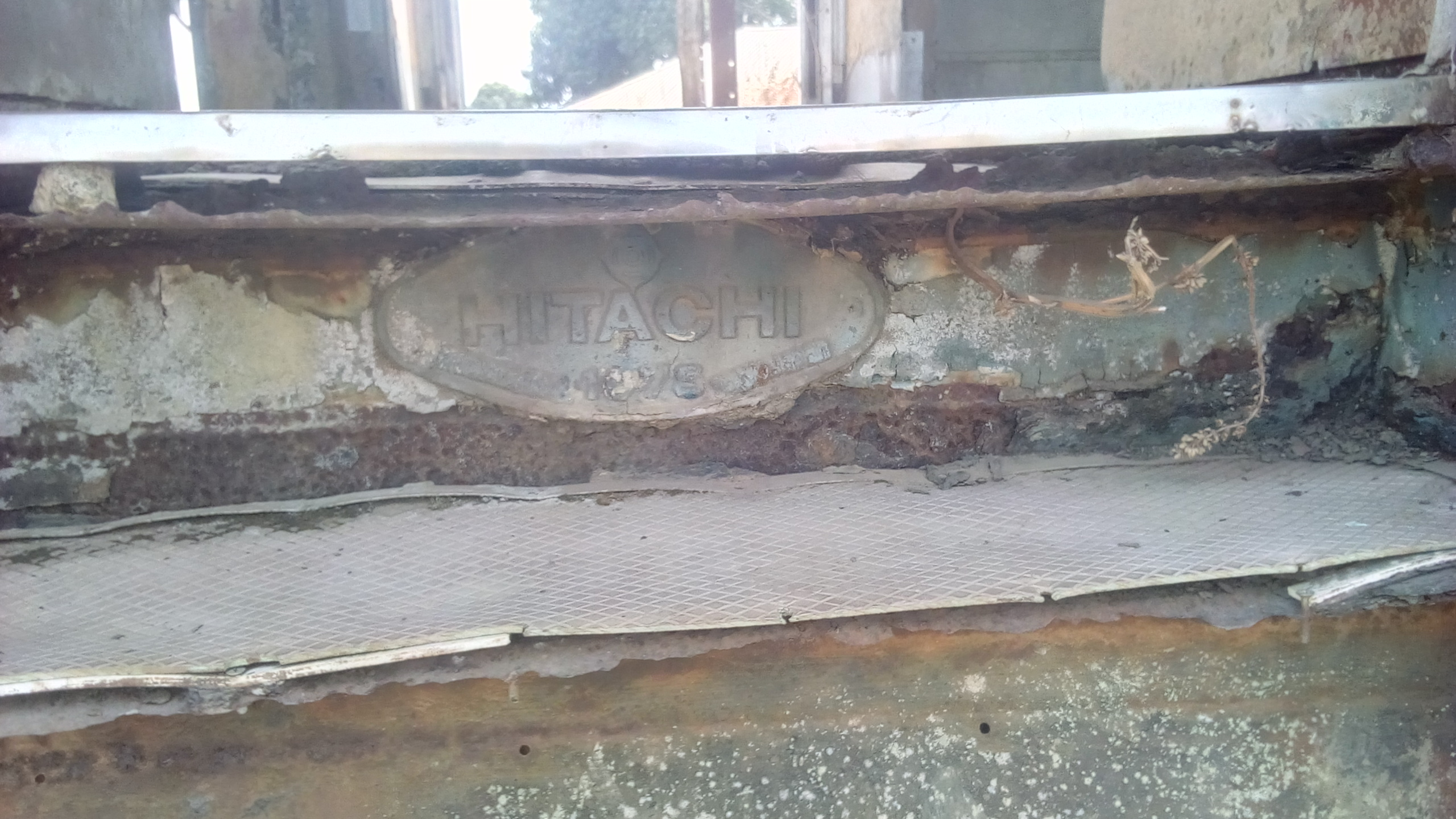
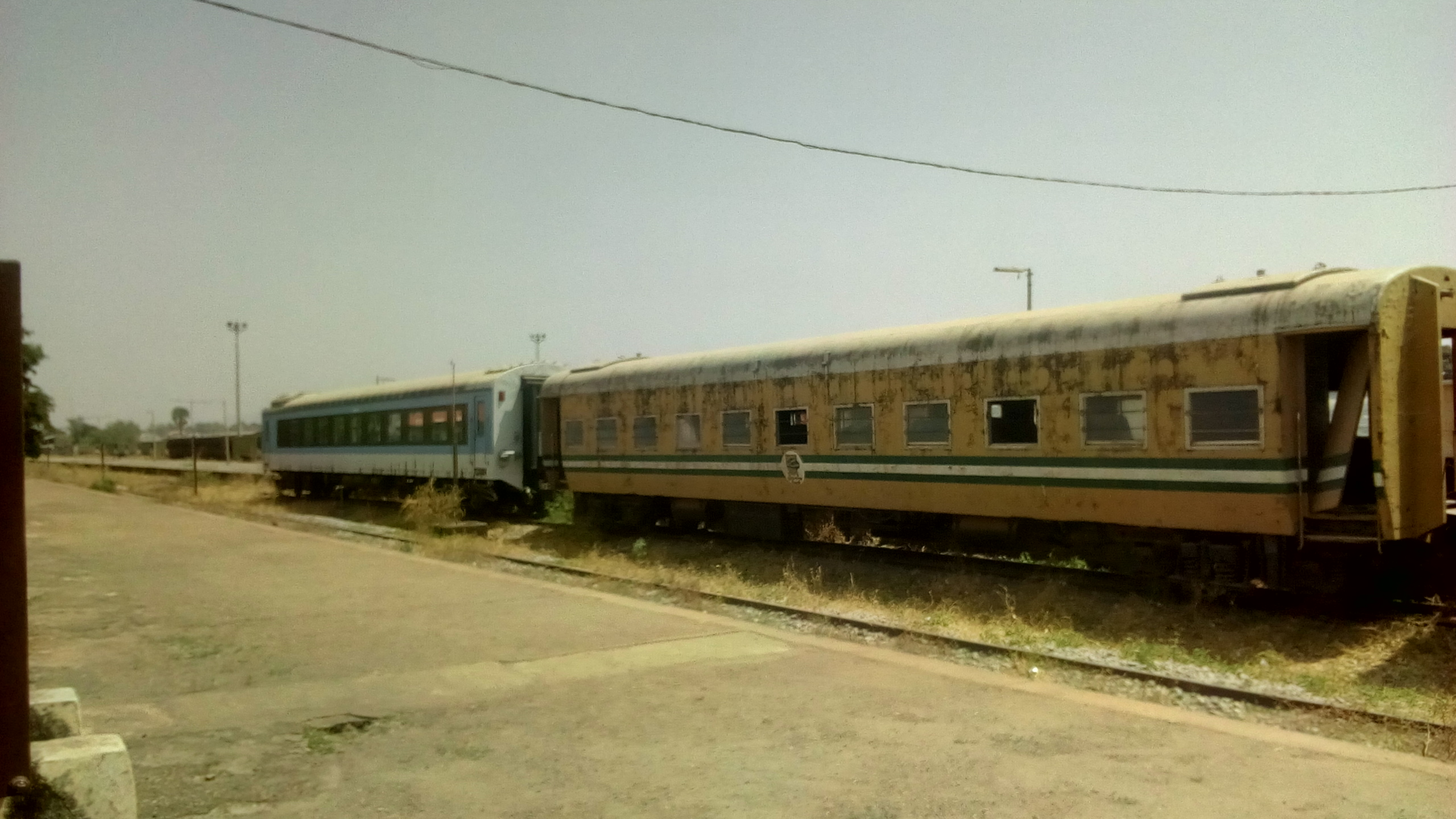
^{Left to right clockwise: Train station signpost • Train station, Rail track • Train scrap • Train scrap dated 1975 • Trains brought in the first half of the 2010s • Rail wood piles • Abandoned train scraps • Railtracks with an old train scrap}

The economic fortunes of Kafanchan grew as long as the Nigerian railway industry thrived. Its growth came to a decline, however, with the fall out of the railway. According to the town's monarch while recounting the good old days, as narrated by Sun Travels:

Kafanchan was very vibrant, while the railways functioned.

— Musa Didam, Agwam Fantswam I (2001-2018)

Before the rise and even after the fall of the railways, the Fantswam people's major occupation is agriculture, and like the natives of Chori, Kwoi, Nok and other areas in Ham land, the Fantswam also grow high-quality ginger in abundance in addition to beans, guinea-corn, millet, maize, yam, cocoyam, rice and fonio (F. tson, H. acha). Their town served as a collection centre for ginger and other agricultural harvest. Daily Trust accounted that passenger railway traffic across the North-Central District with Kafanchan as administrative headquarters generated about 30 percent of [the country's] railway revenue in the late 1980s.

=== Hospitality and tourism ===
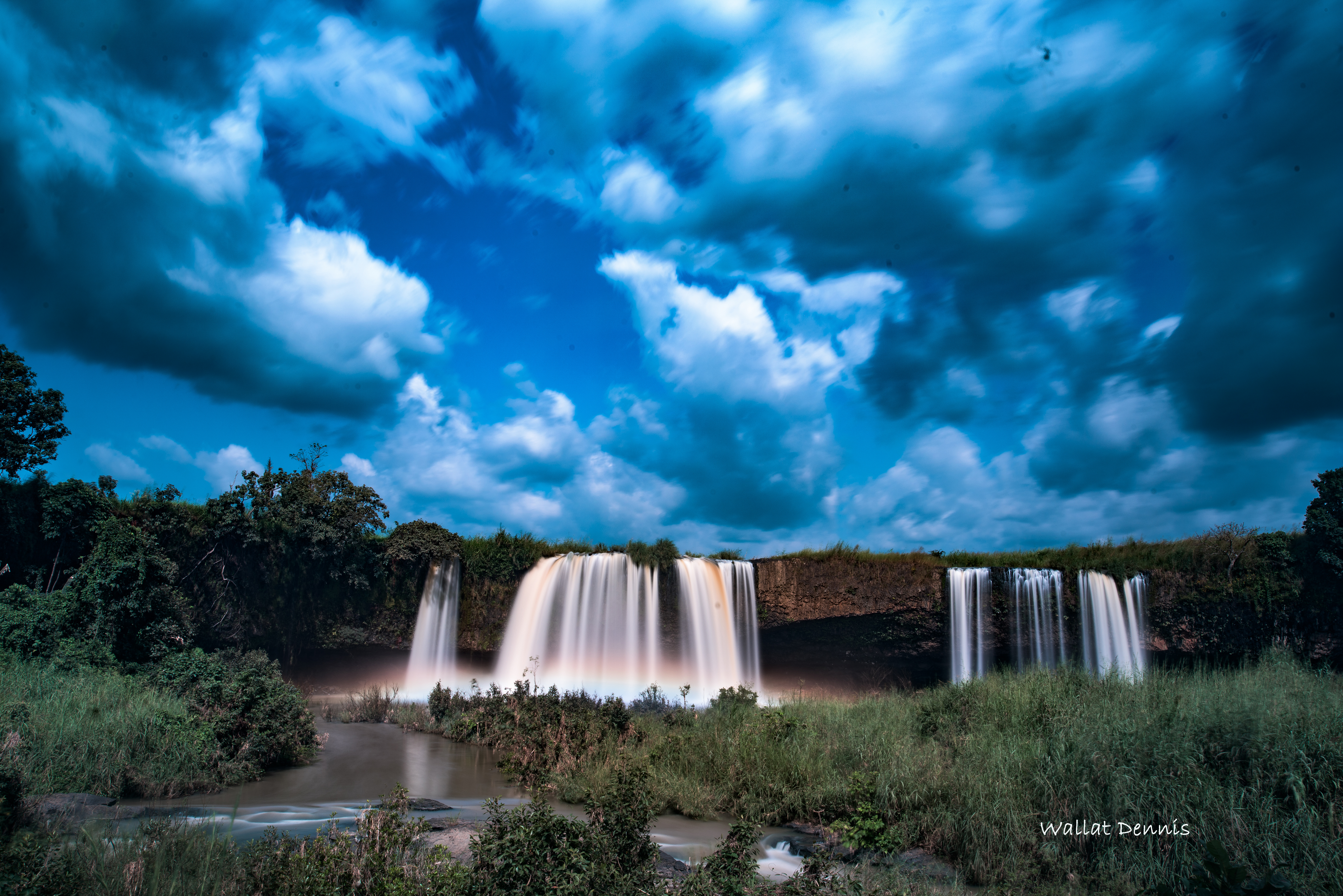
Ka̱byek Tityong waterfalls

Around the town is a waterfall known as Ka̱byek tityong (Hausa: Matsirga, English: River Wonderful) located around Batadon (Madakiya) of Bajju chiefdom and Aduwan District of Fantswam chiefdom, with underdeveloped tourist attraction potentials, although an indigenously owned resort, Fantswam Resort was of late established around the waterfall area in Aduwan IV, Kafanchan.

== Politics ==
The main town earlier comprised two wards of the existing 10 in Jema'a Local Government Area (LGA), namely: Kafanchan A and Kafanchan B, each with a District Head. Today, other wards such as Takau, Kadajya (H. Maigizo), Atuku, Nikyob (H. Kaninkon), and Gidan-Waya have fully and partly become part of the town. The other eight wards in the LGA have four District Heads.

== Notable people ==
- Joseph Bagobiri (late Bishop of the Catholic Diocese of Kafanchan and of St. Peter's Catholic Church, Kafanchan)
- Biyi Bandele, Nigerian filmmaker and writer
- George Bisan, footballer
- Sunday Chibuike, footballer
- HH Agwam Musa Didam, Agwam Fantswam I
- Joe El, Nigerian musical artiste
- HH Agwam (Dr.) Josiah Tagwai Kantiyok, Agwam Fantswam II
- Emmanuel Nuhu Kure, pastor of Throneroom Trust Ministries
- Osita Nebo, clergyman, academic
- Onuora Nzekwu, Nigerian writer, editor
- Emeka Offor, Nigerian entrepreneur
- Emmanuel N. Onwubiko, Nigerian journalist

== See also ==
- Kafanchan Peace Declaration
- Railway stations in Nigeria
- Southern Kaduna
