= Inkil =

Village in Bauchi State, Nigeria

- Village
- Location within Nigeria
- Coordinates: 10°18′37″N 9°53′36″E
- Country: Nigeria
- State: Bauchi State
- LGA: Bauchi
- District: Tirwun
- Elevation: 590 m (1,940 ft)
- Time zone: UTC+01:00 (WAT)
- Postal code: 740
- Climate: Aw

Inkil is a village in Tirwun district, Bauchi Local Government Area, Bauchi State, Nigeria. The postal code of the area is 740. The area has an altitude of 590 m above sea level. The nearest airport to Inkil is the Bauchi Airport (BCU) located around 15 km radius from the town and 5.4 km away from the state capital, Bauchi.

== See also ==
- List of villages in Bauchi State
