= Kaduna State Ministry of Health =

Government ministry of Kaduna State, Nigeria

Kaduna State Ministry of Health is the government ministry responsible for health policy, regulation and public-health service delivery in Kaduna State, Nigeria. The ministry is tasked with coordinating preventive, curative, promotive and rehabilitative healthcare services across the state, regulating private medical facilities, and implementing state and national health policies.

== Leadership ==
The day-to-day operations of the ministry are overseen by the Commissioner for Health. As of 2025, the Commissioner is Umma K. Ahmed.

== Structure and parastatals ==
The Kaduna State Ministry of Health oversees several subordinate agencies and institutions, including:

- State Primary Health Care Agency (SPHCA)
- Drugs and Medical Supply Management Agency (DMSMA)
- Kaduna State Agency for the Control of AIDS (KADSACA)
- Shehu Idris College of Health Sciences and Technology, Makarfi (SICHST)
- College of Nursing, Kafanchan (CON)
- School of Midwifery, Tudun Wada

== See also ==
- Kaduna State
- Ministries of Kaduna State
- Healthcare in Nigeria
