= Rahila Hadea Cudjoe =

Nigeria jurist

Rahila Hadea Cudjoe OFR

Chief Judge of Kaduna State
- In office 1996–2014
- Preceded by: Justice Saka Adeyemi Ibiyeye

Personal details
- Born: 6 October 1948 (age 77) Zaria, Kaduna State, Nigeria
- Education: Ahmadu Bello University
- Occupation: Jurist; Lawyer

Justice Rahila Hadea Cudjoe OFR (born 6 October 1948) is a retired Nigerian jurist and former Chief Judge of Kaduna State. She is the first female Chief judge in Kaduna State and served from 1996 to 2014. She is also first female Lawyer in North Western State as well as the first female Legal Draftsman in Kaduna State.

== Early life and education ==
Justice Rahila was born in Zaria, Kaduna State, in 1948. She attended Our Ladies High School, Kaduna and Government Girls College, Dala, Kano before gaining admission to study law at Ahmadu Bello University, Zaria. Rahila was then called to the Nigerian Bar in 1973.

== Career ==
Rahila began her legal career as a State Counsel in the Kaduna State's Ministry of Justice. In 1979, she was appointed a Legal Draftsman of the Ministry of Justice, Kaduna and a Legislative Counsel to the Kaduna State House of Assembly. In 1983, she was appointed a Judge of the Kaduna State High Court. Under the administration of the former Governor Lawal Kaita of Kaduna State, Rahila was appointed a Chief Judge of the State. In 1992, Rahila lead a Commission of Inquiry into the Zangon-Kataf crises, which produced two reports on the cause of the violence. In 2020, 28 years later, the Kaduna State Executive Council established a committee to draft a White Paper on the two reports produced by Rahila's Commission.

== Memberships ==
- Member, National Judicial Council
- Member, Nigerian Body of Benchers
- Member, Nigerian Bar Association

== See also ==
- List of first women lawyers and judges in Africa
- Chief Judge of Kaduna State
