= Chief judge =

Chief judge may refer to:

== In lower or circuit courts ==
The highest-ranking or most senior member of a lower court or circuit court with more than one judge.

- Chief judge (Australia)
- Chief judge (United States)

== In supreme courts ==
Some of Chief justice positions around supreme courts of world are translated as Chief judge as following.

- Chief Judge of Abia State
- Chief Judge of the High Court of Hong Kong
- Chief Judge of Kaduna State
- Chief Judge of Lagos State
- Chief Judge of Rivers State
- Chief Judge of Sabah and Sarawak

== See also ==
- Lower court
- Supreme court
- Chief justice
