= Amina Mohammed Baloni =

Former Commissioner of Health Kaduna State, Nigeria

Federal Ministry of Health
- In office 2019–2023
- Governor: Nasir El-Rufai

Personal details
- Education: Kaduna Capital School; Queen's College Lagos; Ahmadu Bello University

Amina Mohammed Baloni is the former commissioner of health for Kaduna State. She was appointed by Mallam Nasir El-Rufai.

== Early life and education ==
Aisha Baloni attended Kaduna Capital School, Queen's College Lagos and Ahmadu Bello University Teaching Hospital, Kaduna where she trained as a medical doctor. She obtained certificates from several educational institutes and attended courses in health and development.

== Career ==
During the COVID-19 pandemic, Baloni urged every citizen of Kaduna State who contracted COVID-19 to submit themselves to an isolation centre for medical treatment. Baloni reported on new cases within the state. Before the lockdown of Kaduna State, only 316 people were positive, but the figures rapidly increased to 1,611. She said "Before now, only seven out of the 23 local government areas had cases of infection but COVID-19 is in 17 local governments".

== See also ==
- Ministries of Kaduna State
