= Ministry of Education, Science and Technology (Kaduna State) =

Ministry of Kaduna State

- Ministry of Education, Science and Technology

Agency overview
- Formed: 1964
- Headquarters: Kaduna
- Website: Kaduna State Ministry of education

Ministry of Education, Science and Technology is an arm of the state government of Kaduna state, The ministry has the responsibilities of controlling, monitoring, implementing science and technology in the field of education to the people of the state. The ministry carries out the project of developing education in primary schools, secondary schools, colleges, polytechnics and universities of the state. The ministry sponsored students to study abroad free of charge by giving them scholarships.

In June 2017, the state government announced the scholarship opportunities for 30 candidates to study Medicine, Nursing and Health Technology-related and other courses in Cuba to fill the gap in the health sector.

== Schools ==
In Kaduna State, every ward has a primary school known as L.E.A, and there secondary schools within the state although not in every ward. The state also has higher institutions under the control of the ministry.

- Nuhu Bamalli Polytechnic
- Kaduna State University

== See also ==
Ministries of Kaduna State
