= Ministry of Agriculture and Forestry =

Ministry of Agriculture and Forestry may refer to:

- Ministry of Agriculture and Forestry (Alberta), in the Executive Council of Alberta, Canada
- Ministry of Agriculture and Forestry (Bulgaria), now the Ministry of Agriculture, Food and Forestry
- Ministry of Agriculture and Forestry (Equatorial Guinea)
- Ministry of Agriculture and Forestry (Finland)
- Ministry of Agriculture and Forestry (Japan), now the Ministry of Agriculture, Forestry and Fisheries
- Ministry of Agriculture and Forestry (Kaduna State), Nigeria, now the Ministry of Agriculture
- Ministry of Agriculture and Forestry (Laos)
- Ministry of Agriculture and Forestry (New Zealand), now defunct and part of the Ministry for Primary Industries
- Ministry of Agriculture and Forestry (South Korea), now the Ministry for Food, Agriculture, Forestry and Fisheries
- Ministry of Agriculture and Forestry (South Sudan)
- Ministry of Agriculture and Forestry (Turkey)

== See also ==
- List of agriculture ministries
- List of forestry ministries
