= Aisha Ahmad Suleiman =

Nigerian polo player, photographer, and entrepreneur

Personal information
- Nickname: Black Eesha
- Born: 17 December 2001 (age 24) Kaduna State, Nigeria

Sport
- Sport: Polo
- Team: Kaduna Polo Club

Aisha Ahmad Suleiman born (17 December 2001) is a Northern Nigerian female polo player, photographer, and entrepreneur. She is from Kogi state. She was born and brought up in Kaduna state, Nigeria. Suleiman is one of the very few black female polo players in the world and the only female polo player from the Northern Nigeria at the moment. She plays for the Kaduna Polo Club.

== Early life and background ==
Suleiman is a native of Adavi local government area of Kogi State; she was born and raised in Kaduna North, Kaduna State, Nigeria. She is a daughter to Ahmad Suleiman and Hauwa Bello. Aisha Ahmad Suleiman attended nursery, primary and secondary schools in Kaduna.

== Career ==
The first encounter Suleiman had with horses was when she attended a polo match with friends. Suleiman got in touch with a man named Husseini Muhammed who happened to be the coach and trainers of polo beginners in Kaduna. Husseini gave her a first mallet to play with. Suleiman played her first tournament on 17 December 2017 in Kaduna.

== Awards and trophies ==
- Winner of Dantata and Sawoe Cup, Kano International Tournament 2018
- Winner Of The Governor's Cup, Port Harcourt International Tournament 2019.
- Winner Of The Governor's Cup, Kano International Tournament 2019.
- Sport Woman Year 2020, Northern Pandora Awards
- Nominee of The African Horse Weeke 2020
