= Ministry of Agriculture (Kaduna State) =

Ministry of Kaduna State

- Ministry of Agriculture

Agency overview
- Formed: 1980
- Headquarters: Kaduna
- Website: Kaduna State Ministry of agriculture

Ministry of Agriculture was founded in 1980. It has the responsibilities of providing policy and direction for the state Government towards Agriculture. The ministry also provides the functions of implementing agencies, it has only two agencies for now. The Kaduna State government establish an e-library and data banks for its Ministry of Agriculture to support the ability of the staffers of the ministry in the areas of making a good planning, budgeting, monitoring, evaluation and coordination of necessary work needed within the ministry.

== Agency ==
The agencies work as the arm of the Ministry to carry out some specific project.

- Kaduna State Agricultural Development Project (KADP)
- Kaduna State Forest Management Project (KSFMP)

== Departments ==
The departments in the Ministry include;

- Engineering Services (Agriculture Engineering and Irrigation Services)
- Agricultural Services (Horticulture, Produce, Fisheries etc.)

== See also ==
Ministries of Kaduna State
