= Matsirga waterfalls =

Waterfall in Kafanchan, Nigeria

Matsirga Waterfalls
- Ka̱byek Tityong
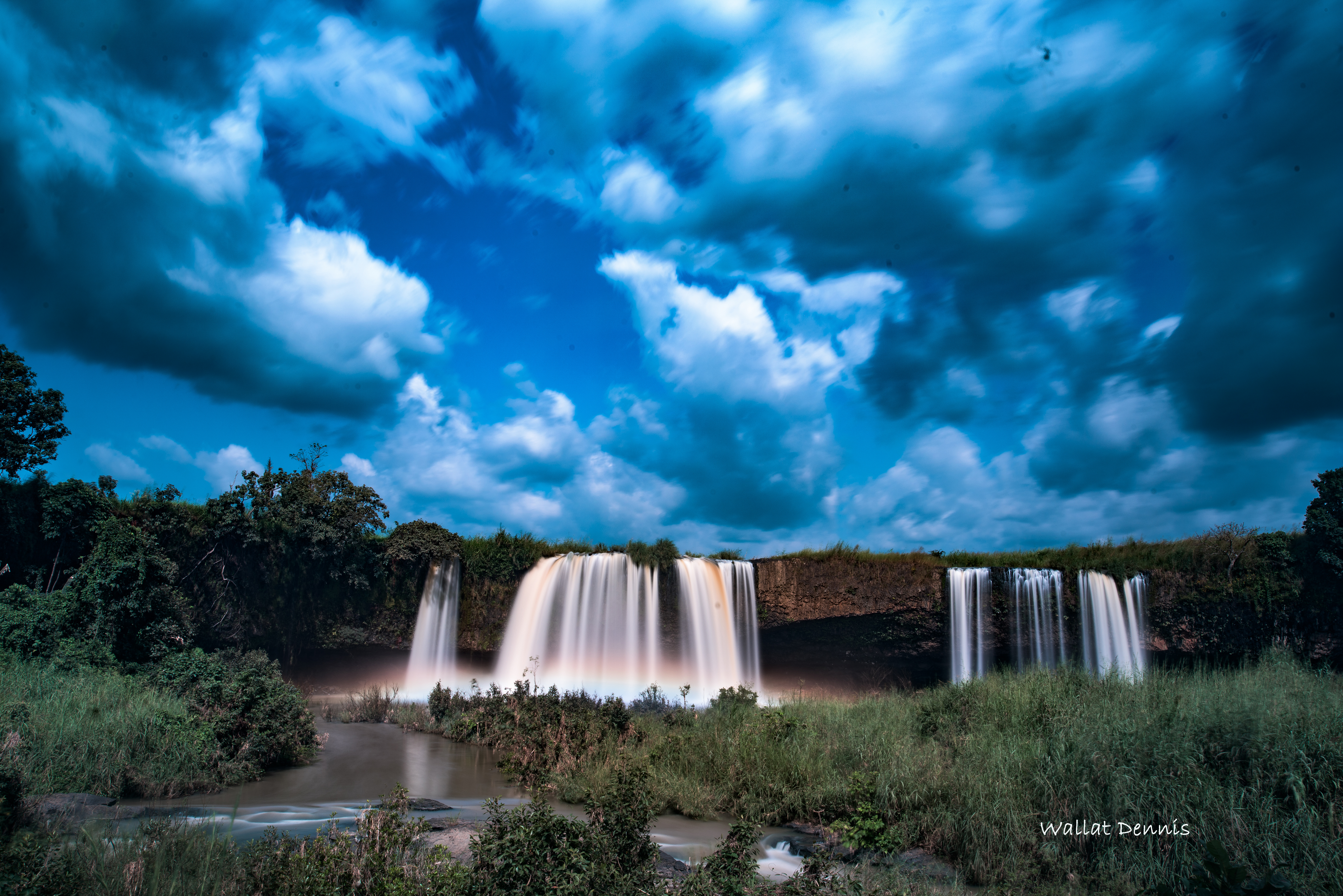
- Front view of the Matsirga Waterfalls

- Location within Nigeria
- Location: Kafanchan, Kaduna State, Nigeria
- Coordinates: 9°34′N 8°18′E
- Type: Segmented
- Total height: 25 m (82 ft)
- Total width: 200 m (656 ft)

Matsirga Waterfalls (Fantswam: Ka̱byek Tityong; Tyap: A̱ga̱ra̱ng Ma̱'jhyo; Hausa: Matsirga; English: "River Wonderful") is a segmented waterfall located near Batadon (Madakiya) in Zangon Kataf LGA, southern Kaduna State, Nigeria. From springs on the Kagoro Hills, water cascades over a cliff into a plunge pool below, producing an arresting natural display.

== Geography ==
Situated approximately 227 km south of Kaduna city, Matsirga’s waters drop 25–30 m over a rocky ledge into a gorge framed by striking rock formations. The waterfall width expands up to around 200 m during peak flow.

== Hydrology and Seasonality ==
Fed by multiple springs from the elevated Kagoro Hills, Matsirga sees high flow during the June–September rainy season—sometimes causing overflow of its banks—while retaining an impressive cascade year-round.

== Ecological Context ==
The area around the waterfall hosts a humid microclimate supporting lush riparian vegetation contrasting with the surrounding Sudan Savanna. While formal ecological surveys are lacking, travel accounts note the presence of shade-loving plants and bird species typical of moist habitats.

== Cultural Significance ==
Located within Fantswam chiefdom territory, Matsirga holds strong traditional value. Its local names ("Ka̱byek Tityong" and "River Wonderful") reflect cultural reverence. Oral traditions mention recurring rainbows and mist phenomena that local people attribute spiritual meaning to.

== Tourism and Access ==
Accessible via Kafanchan, the waterfall lies roughly two kilometres off the Kafanchan–Madakiya road. Visitors typically arrive via unpaved tracks and hire local guides. Despite limited formal facilities, common activities include picnicking in natural rock shelters, light hiking, and photography.

== Development Initiatives ==
Kaduna State Government has identified Matsirga as a key tourism asset, alongside Kagoro Hills, with plans to improve access roads and invest in infrastructure through public–private partnerships. A private heritage resort—Madakiya Heritage Resort—is under development near the site.

== Tourism Potential ==
Matsirga is well-positioned within a broader cultural and natural tourism circuit including the Nok Heritage Site and Kagoro’s Afan Festival. Experts highlight its eco-tourism promise for job creation and cultural preservation if infrastructure and promotion are improved.

== See also ==
- List of waterfalls of Nigeria
- Tourism in Nigeria
- Kaduna State
- Media related to Matsirga Waterfalls at Wikimedia Commons
