= Kaduna State Judiciary =

Kaduna State unified court system

The Kaduna State Judiciary is the third arm of government in the state government, while the other two being the Executive and the Legislature. It is organized under the Nigerian constitution and laws of the Kaduna State. The state judiciary is responsible for the administration of Justice in the state, it adjudicates in disputes between the state government and any other persons within its jurisdiction. The Chief Judge is appointed by the Kaduna State Governor with the consent of the House of Assembly to serve until the end of their tenure, resigned, impeached and convicted, retire, or die.

== Courts ==
There are a total of 223 courts spread all over the state, it comprises the State High Court, Magistrate Court, Sharia Court of Appeal, Customary Court of Appeal and Customary Courts.

The High Court is a superior court of record with judicial division in Kaduna, Zaria and Kafanchan. Areas of its adjudication include; Original jurisdiction in both civil and criminal proceedings, it performs supervisory jurisdiction and also administrative duties, It is the last resort before the Supreme Court of Nigeria.

Sharia Court of Appeal it is an appellate court and its adjudicates supervisory in civil and criminal proceedings involving questions as of Islamic law, and it also performs administrative duties.

Customary Court of Appeal it performs same or similar functions as the Sharia court of appeal but it only adjudicate supervisory jurisdiction in civil proceedings and questions involving customary law.
