= Kaduna State Environmental Protection Authority =

Environmental authority in Nigeria

Kaduna State Environmental Protection Authority (KEPA) is local environmental authority in Kaduna State, Nigeria. It was established in 1994. As of 2021, Alhaji Jibrin Lawa was the general manager of the authority. In 2018, Ibrahim Rigasa was general manager.

After an assessment of flooding potential in 2021, the authority issued 305 relocation notices to residents living in flood prone areas.

== History ==
=== Background ===
Established in 1994 and revised in 1998, KEPA address environmental problems in the state for sustainability purposes.

== Organization ==
The Kaduna State Environmental Protection Authority has a governing council consisting of the Secretary to the State Government who is the Chairman, and Permanent Secretary of various ministries. It also has a general manager, environmental representatives from the private sector and ministry of water resources, as well as a legal adviser.

== Legal Authority ==
In 2009, the Kaduna State House of Assembly enacted a law to substitute the Kaduna State Environmental Protection Authority Edict No. 1 of 1998. This modification cuts across the following:

- Objectives, Establishment and Functions of the Authority.
- Composition and responsibilities of Governing Council/Principal Officers of the Authority.
- Appointment of the General Manager, Chief Executive, and other Staff of the Authority, as well as their functions.
- Prohibition and Offences.
- Criminal Liability
- Misrepresentation of Office or Authority.
- Auditing of annual statement.
- Indemnification of Officer of the Authority, amongst others.
