= Abubakar Mahmud Gumi Market =

Market in Kaduna, Nigeria

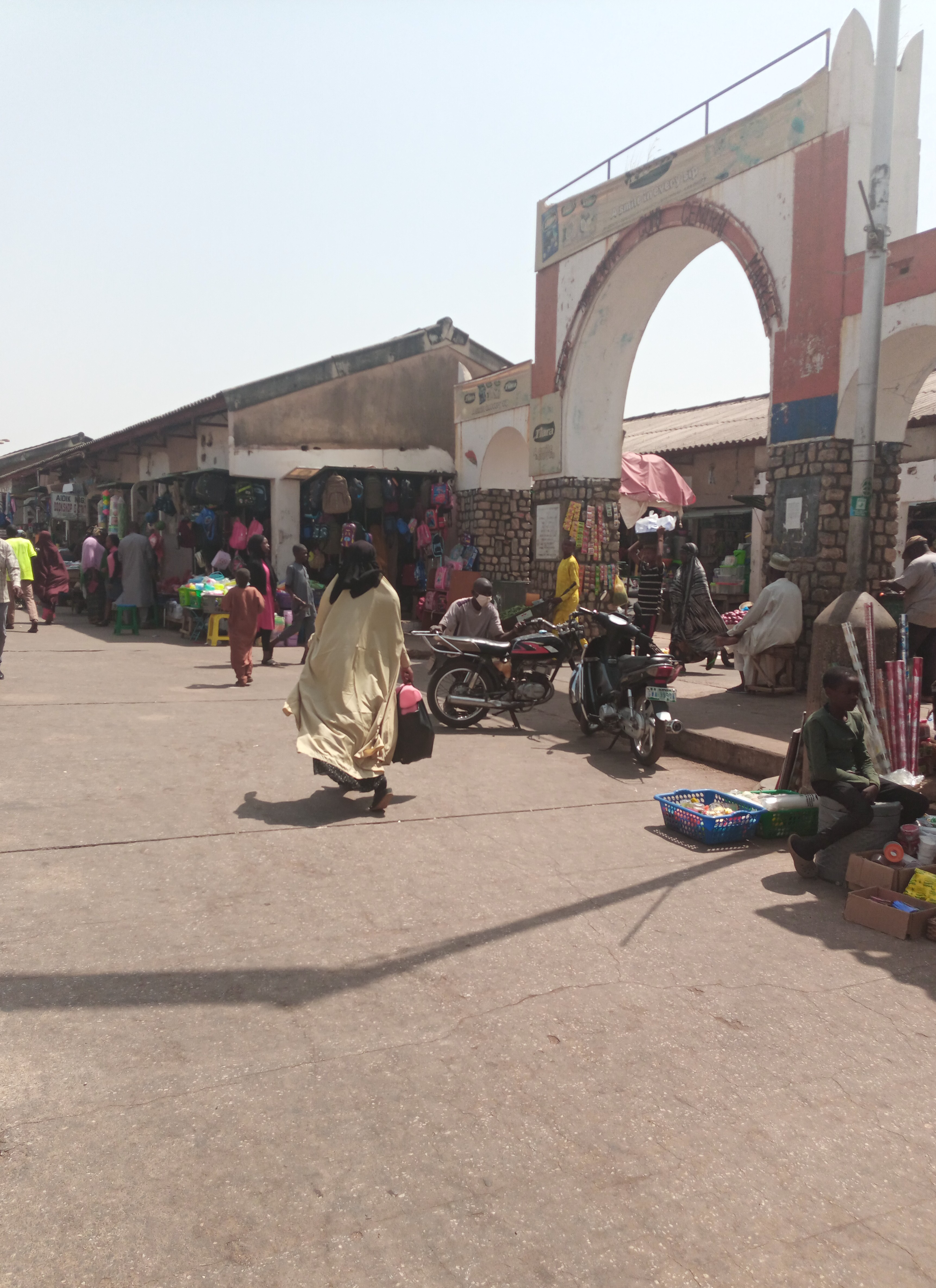
- One of the main gates

General information
- Location: Kaduna North and Kaduna South, Nigeria
- Coordinates: 10.518553°N 7.427611°E
- Construction started: 1970
- Completed: 1975

Design and construction
- Designations

Abubakar Mahmud Gumi Market, also known as Kaduna Central Market, is the biggest marketplace in the centre of Kaduna, the capital of Kaduna State, Nigeria. It is bordered by Kaduna North to the northeast and Kaduna South to the southwest. The market is one of the largest economic hubs in the northern Nigeria region, and one of the busiest transportation yards, Ahmadu Bello Way, is the major expressway that links to various parts of the market.

Former Vice President Yemi Osinbajo once visited the market, accompanied by the Governor of Kaduna State, Mallam Nasir Ahmad el-Rufai.

== History ==
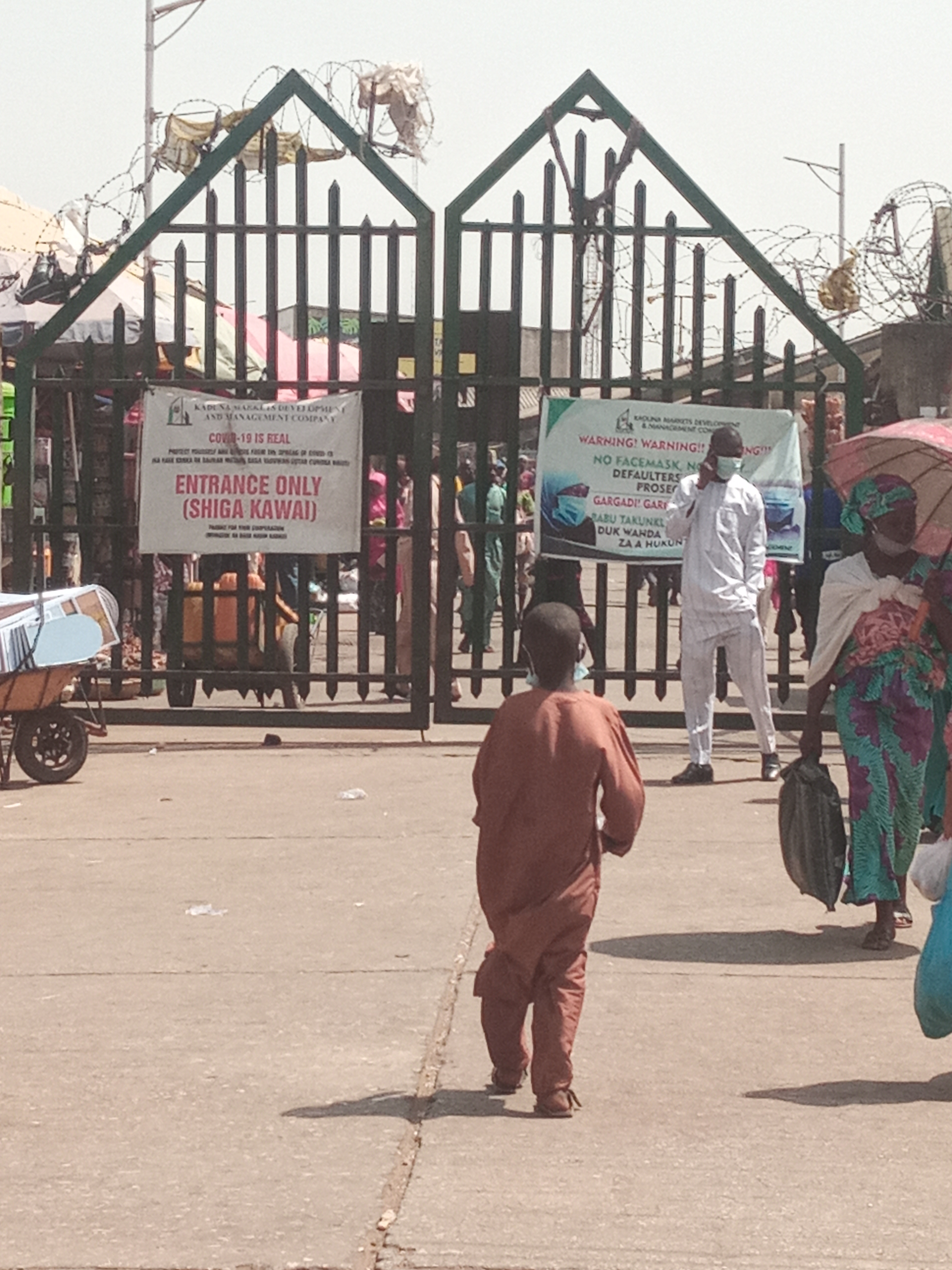
One of the gates at the market

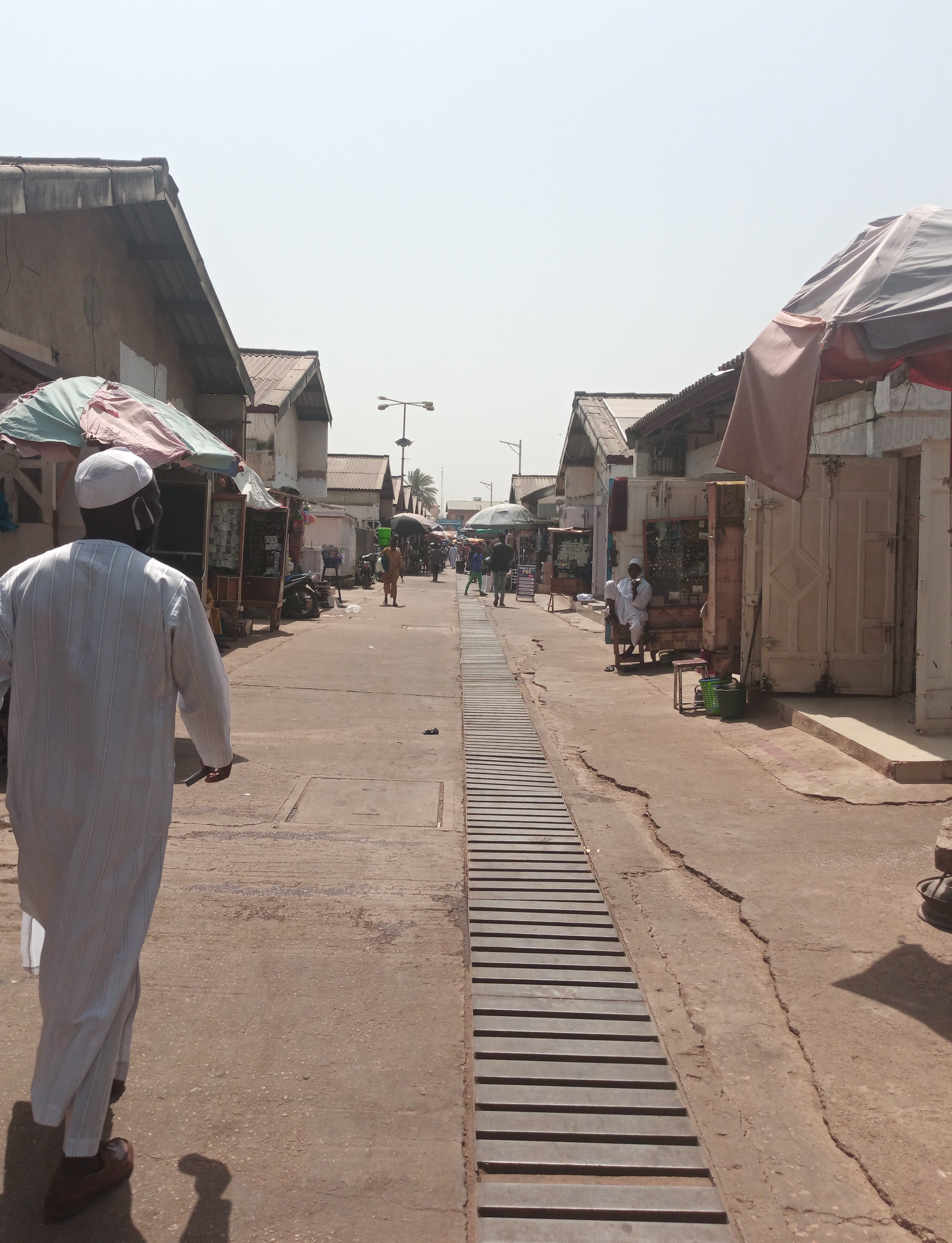
Market's main street

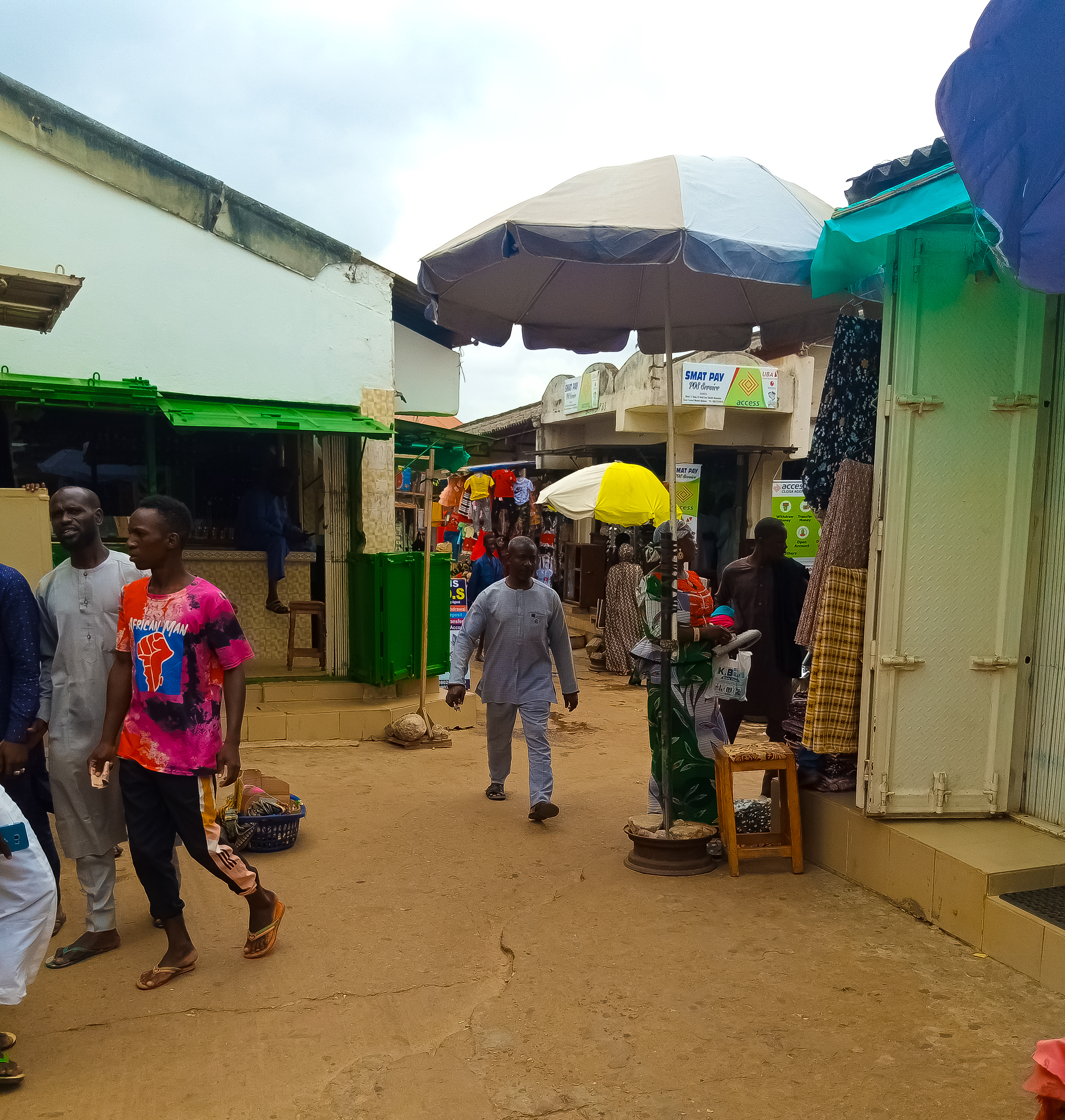
Inside Central market kaduna state

The original name of the market was Kaduna Central Market. In 1994 it was renamed after a prominent scholar of Sunni Islam, the late Sheik Abubakar Gumi. It is the center of commerce in Kaduna State and it is owned by the state government. People of different ethnic groups are present in the market, including Yoruba, Hausa and Igbo people.

== 2000 fire ==
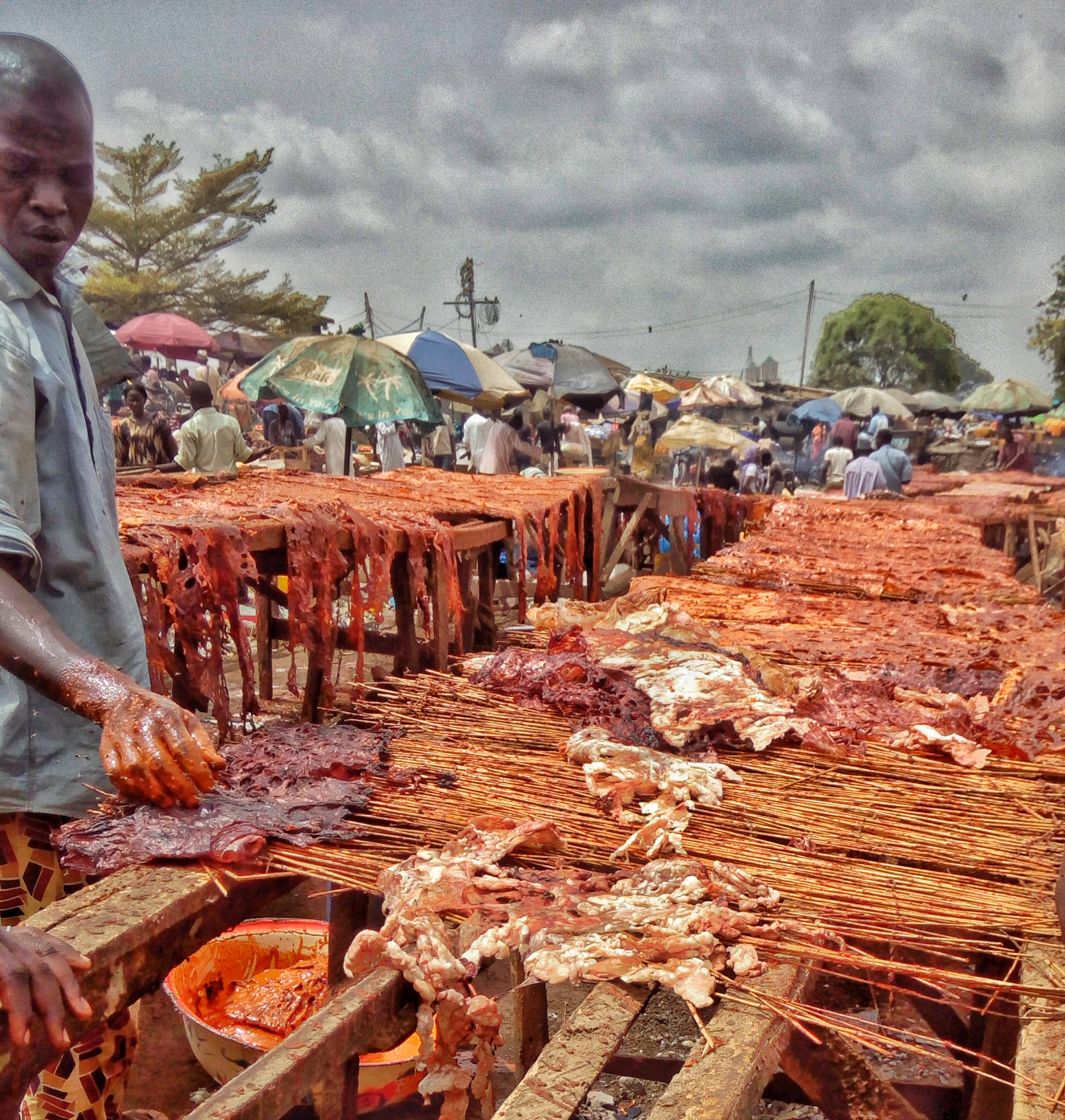
Spot for Kilishi in Central market kaduna state

On March 16, 2000, a devastating fire broke out in the market,causing significant damage to traders' shops and resulting in the loss of stalls, money, and goods worth millions of Nigerian naira. A similar incident had occurred several years before.

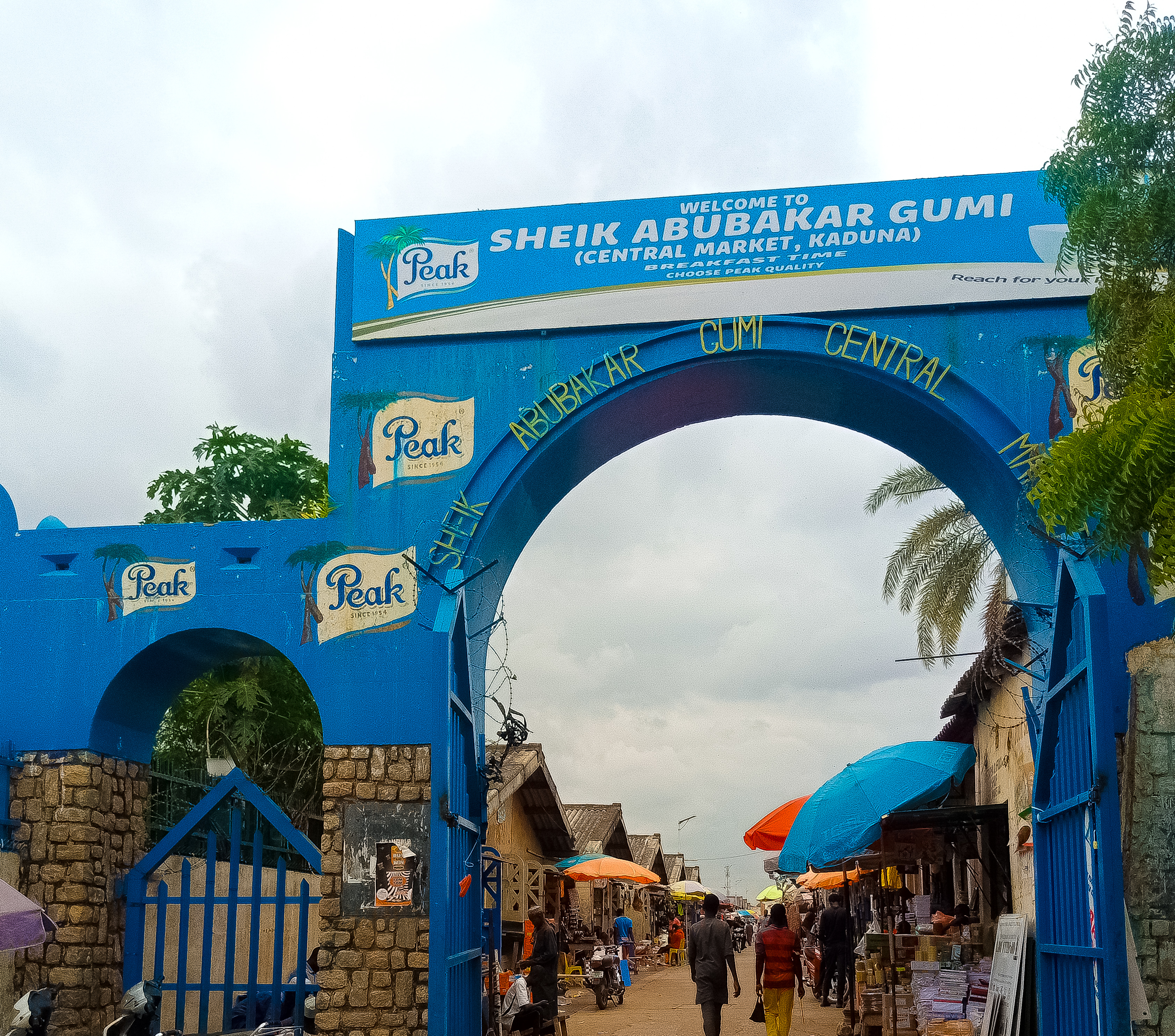
The gate to Abubakar Mahmud Gumi Central Market

Following the fire in 2000, the government rebuilt the market, providing a platform for economic activities in the region.

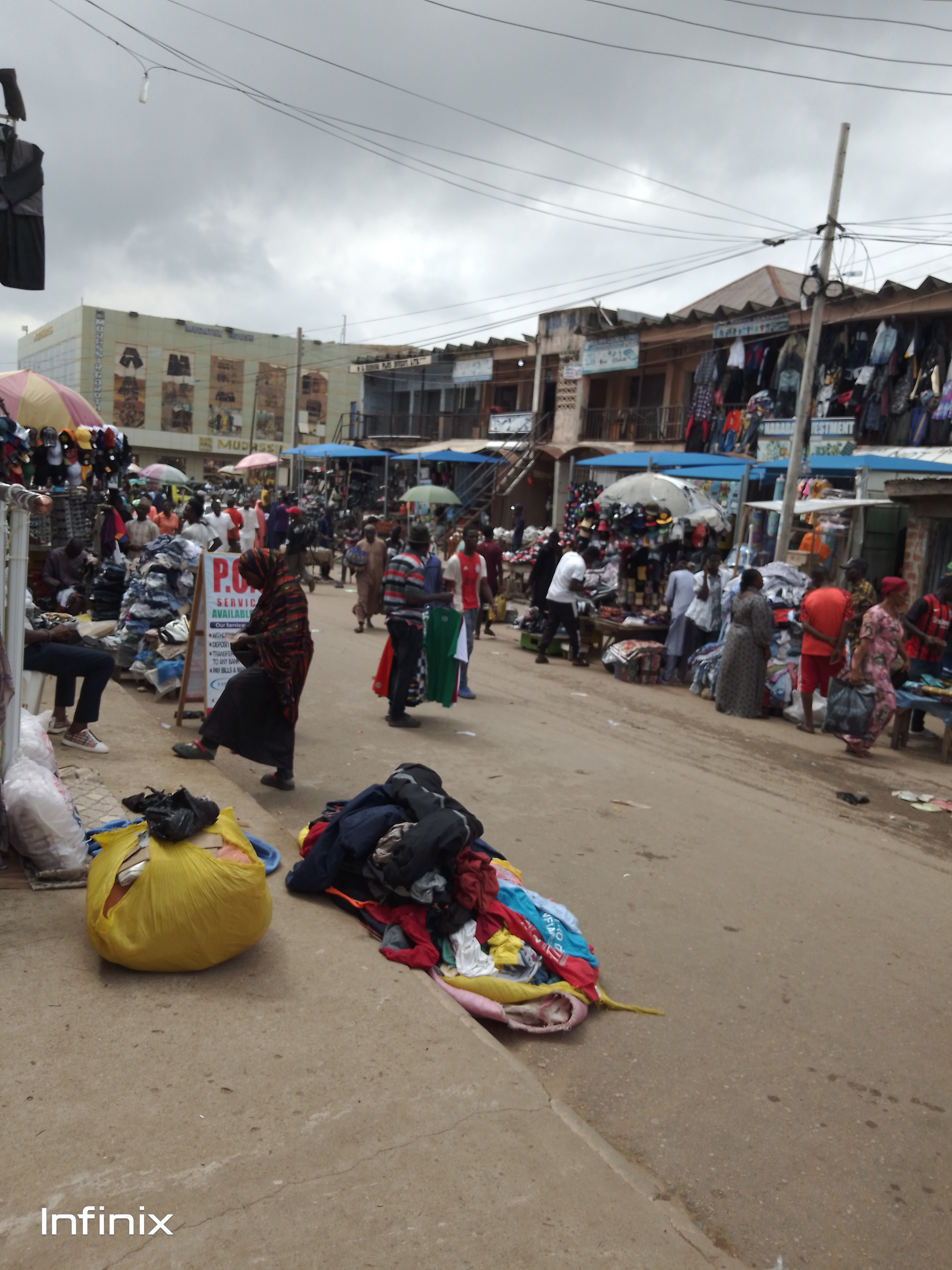
some area of business in Kaduna central market

== 2019 fire ==
On October 20, 2019, a fire near the market railway station destroyed over 31 shops, including food worth millions of naira. The fire started around 2 o'clock in the morning, when only guards were present at the market. While the cause of the fire could not be determined, shop owners believed it was due to poor electrical wiring.

== Gallery ==
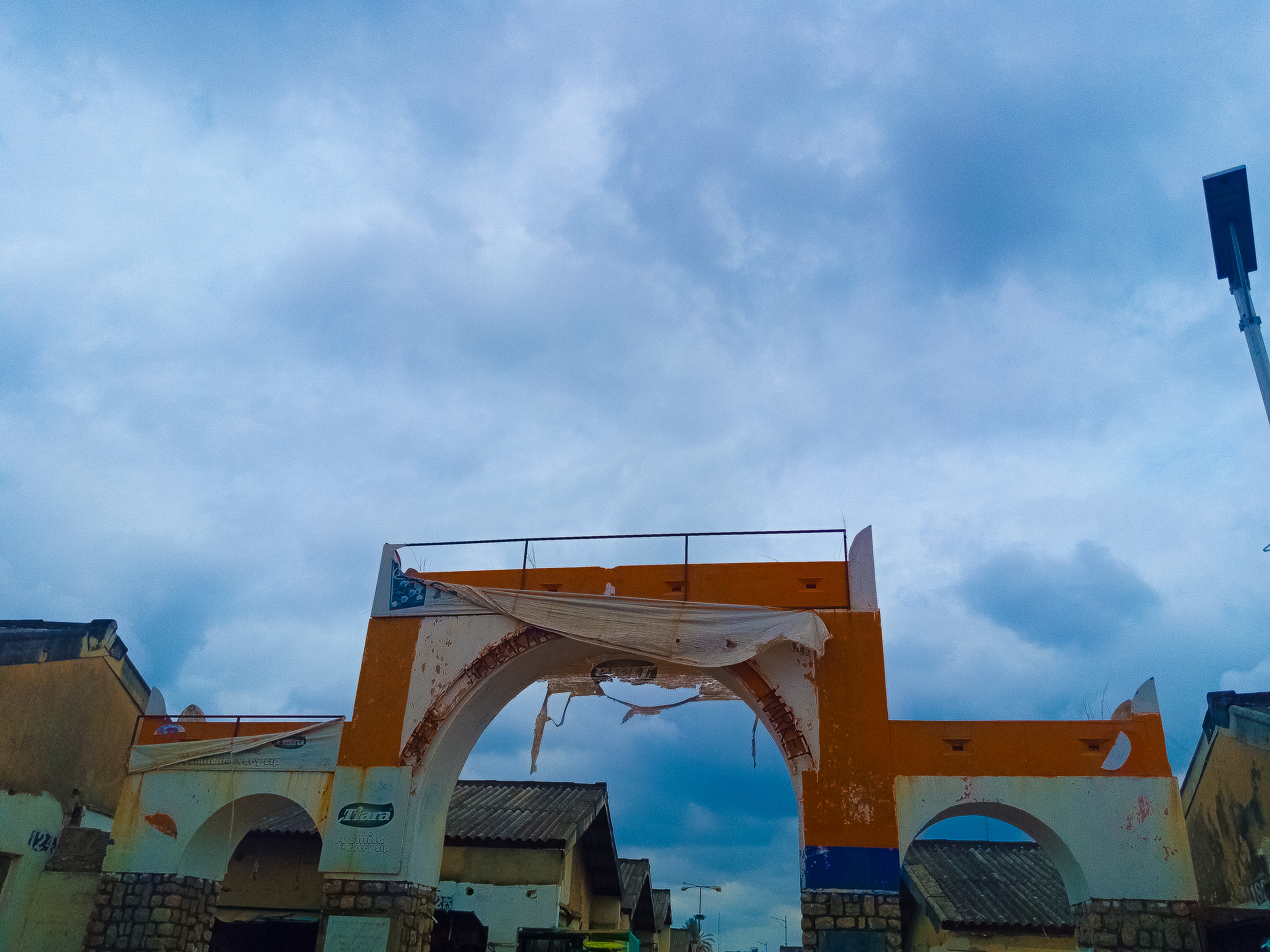

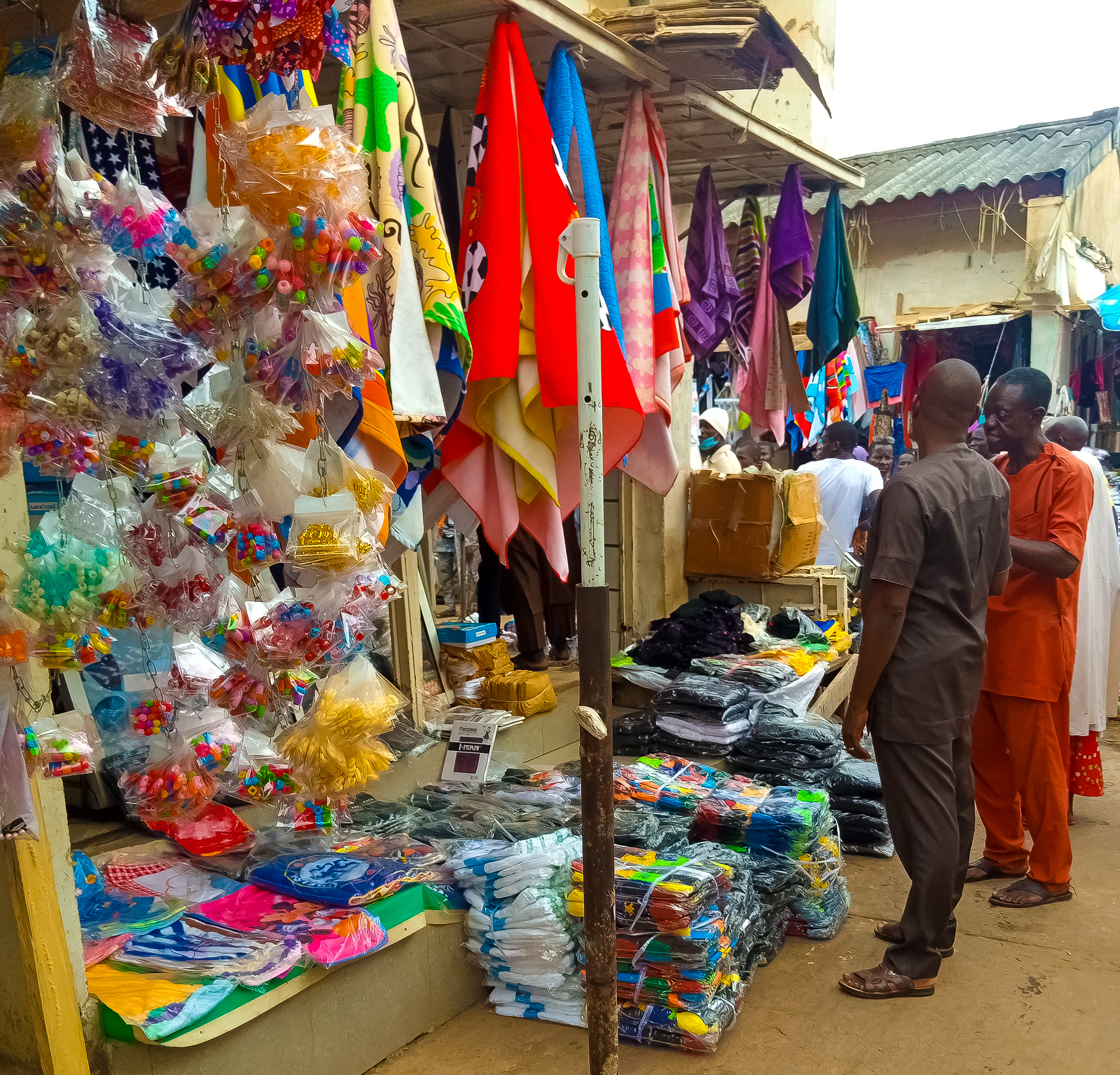

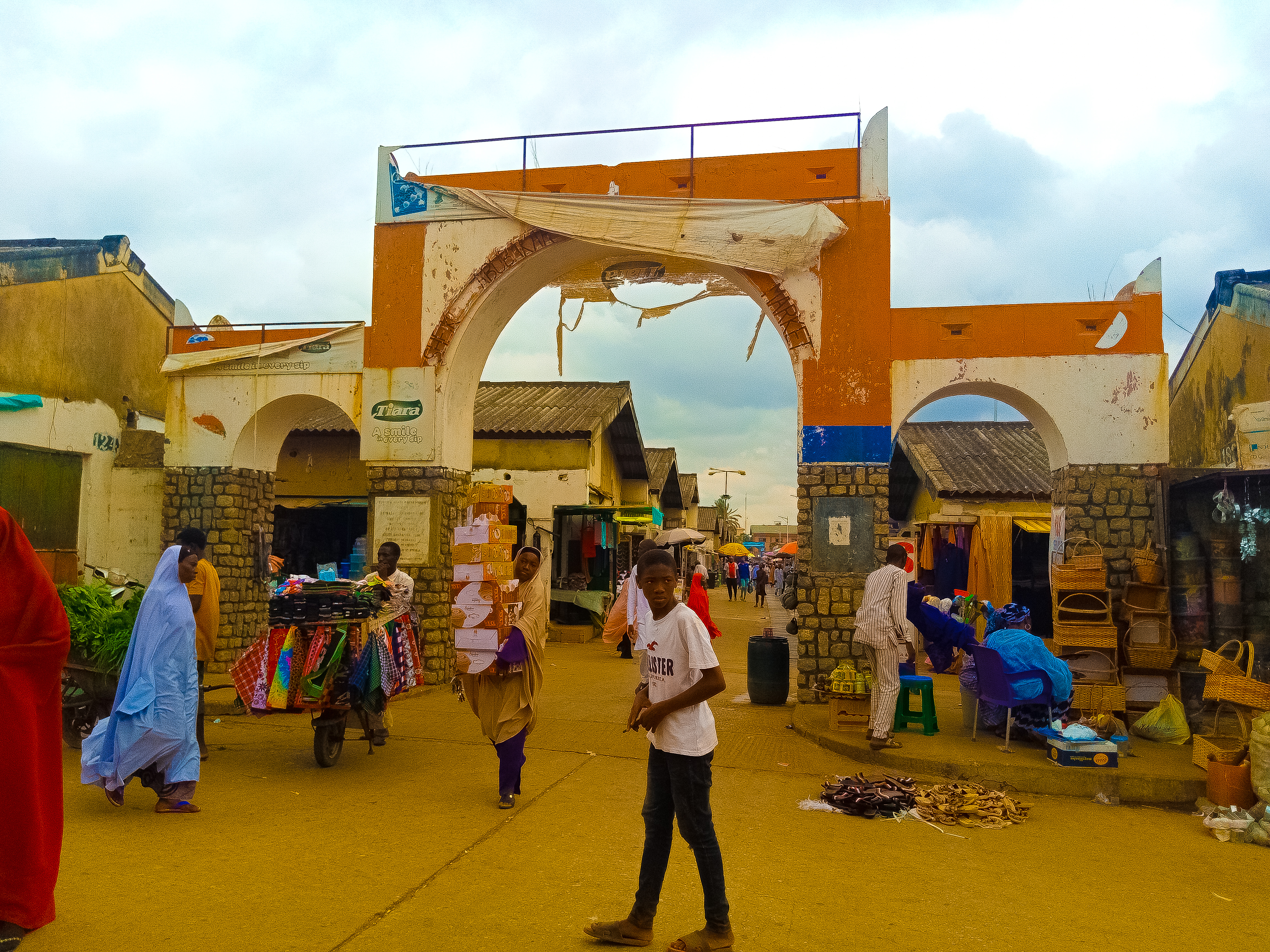
