= A236 highway (Nigeria) =

Road in Nigeria

Coordinates: 10.687683°N 8.37244°E

Trunk Road A236

Location
- Country: Nigeria

Highway system
- Transport in Nigeria

The A236 highway is a highway in central Nigeria. It is one of the east-west roads linking the main south-north roads.Like the other highways with name 23- (e.g. A232), it connects the A2 highway to the A3 highway.

The A236 highway runs from the A2 highway at Zaria, Kaduna State, to the A3 highway at Jos, the capital of Plateau State, whilst also connecting to the A11 toward Katabu at Pambeguwa. The highway passes by towns such as Saminaka and Soba.
