= Muhammadu Lawal Bello =

Chief Judge of Kaduna State

Chief Judge of Kaduna State
- In office 16 May 2019 – 2023
- Nominated by: Nasir Ahmad el-Rufai
- Preceded by: Tanimu Zailani
- Succeeded by: Tukur Mu’azu

Personal details
- Born: Muhammadu Lawal Bello; 24 April 1957 (age 69) Lere, Kaduna State
- Education: Ahmadu Bello University

Muhammadu Lawal Bello (born 24 April 1957) served as the Chief Judge of the High Court of Justice of Kaduna State, Nigeria. He succeeded Chief judge Tanimu Zailani.

== Education ==
Bello attended Sardauna Memorial College, Kaduna from 1969 to 1973. He then moved to Government College Katsina, where he obtained his secondary certificate. He went to Ahmadu Bello University between 1977 and 1980. He went to Katsina College of Arts and Technology, then attended Nigerian Law School between 1980 and 1981 in Lagos.

== Judicial career ==
Muhammadu Lawal Bello was confirmed as a Chief Judge of the High Court of Justice of Kaduna State on May 16, 2019. He held different offices in different parts of Nigeria between 1975 and 2018. He was appointed the acting chief judge of Kaduna State. He was once clerical assistant in Kaduna State under High Court of Justice National Youth Service Corps; Legal Department Benue State House of Assembly, Makurdi. He become Magistrate Grade II where he rose to Chief Magistrate Court Zaria. He also became Chief Magistrate Court, Lugard Hall Kaduna. He then became Solicitor General and Director General, Ministry of Justice, Kaduna State. and other offices.
