= Chief Judge of Kaduna State =

- Incumbent; Muhammad Lawal Bello; Acting since May 25, 2019
- Style: My Lord (Informal); The Honorable (Formal); Your Lordship (When addressed directly in court)
- Appointer: Kaduna State Governor nomination with House of Assembly confirmation
- Term length: 4 years
- Formation: Constitution of Nigeria; May 27, 1967

The Chief Judge of Kaduna State is the head of the Kaduna State Judiciary, the judicial branch of the Kaduna State Government and the chief judge of the High Court of Kaduna State. From 1967 to 1973, the title was called Chief Justice of the Supreme Court. The appointment is often made by the Governor.

== List of Chief Judges 1960 to date ==
- The Hon. Sir Hugh Hurley KT (1960–1968)
- Sir Nigel V Reed (1969–1975)
- Hon. Justice Arthur WA Wheeler (1975–1979)
- Justice Shehu Usman Muhammad (1979–1992)
- Justice Saka Adeyemi Ibiyeye (1992–1996)
- Justice Rahila Hadea Cudjoe (1996–2014)
- Justice Tanimu Zailani (2013–2018)
- Justice Muhammadu Lawal Bello (2018 to date)
