= A235 highway (Nigeria) =

Road in Nigeria

Coordinates: 9.764382°N 8.331671°E

Trunk Road A235

Location
- Country: Nigeria

Highway system
- Transport in Nigeria

The A235 highway is a highway in Nigeria. It is one of the east-west roads linking the main south-north roads. (It is named after the two highways it links). It runs from the A2 highway at Kaduna to the A3 highway south of Jos, the capital of Plateau State.
