= Kaduna North =

Local Government Area in Kaduna State, Nigeria

Kaduna North Kaduna ta Arewa^{(Hausa)} Ka̠duna da̠ Ka̠za^{(Jju)} Ka̠duna ma̠ A̠za^{(Tyap)}
- LGA
- Interactive map of Kaduna North
- Coordinates: 9°54′N 7°24′E
- Country: Nigeria
- State: Kaduna State
- Headquarters: Doka

Government
  - Executive Chairman: Hon Muhammad Gambo

Area
  - Total: 70.2 km^{2} (27.1 sq mi)
- Elevation: 650 m (2,130 ft)

Population (2006)
  - Total: 364,575
  - Density: 7,010/km^{2} (18,200/sq mi)
- Time zone: UTC+1 (WAT)
- Postal code: 800.
- ISO 3166 code: NG.KD.KN

Kaduna North, often referred to as the pioneer local government, is a Local Government Area in Kaduna State, Nigeria. It is the capital of Kaduna State and its headquarters are in the town of Doka. Its postal code is 800. It has an area of 70.2 km^{2}.

== History ==
Kaduna North is one of the oldest local government in the state. Its secretariat is located at Magajin Gari, Doka.

== Demographics ==
Kaduna North is located between latitudes 10:35 North and Longitudes 7:25 East. It is bordered by Igabi local government to the North and West, and Southwest, by Kaduna South local government, Chikun local government to the east. It has an area of about 72 km^{2} and density of 5, 883.1 inh./km^{2}. The population of Kaduna north is at 423,580 as of 2006 Nigeria population census.

=== Administrative subdivisions ===
Kaduna North Local Government Area consisting of 12 subdivisions (second-order administrative divisions) or electoral wards, namely:

1. Badarawa
2. Dadi Riba
3. Hayin Banki
4. Kabala
5. Kawo
6. Maiburiji
7. Sardauna
8. Shaba
9. Unguwan Dosa
10. Unguwar Rimi
11. Unguwar Sarki
12. Unguwar Shanu
13. Unguwar kanawa

== Geology ==
The entire Kaduna state is underlain by a basement complex of igneous and metamorphic rocks of mainly Jurassic to Pre-Cambrian ages. The basement complex rocks are essentially granites, gneisses, migmatites, schists and quartzites (Benett, 1979;13). The geology of Kaduna North is predominantly metamorphic rocks of the Nigerian basement complex consisting of biotite gneisses and older granites (Kaduna State, 2003).

The topographical relief is relatively flat, having an elevation of between 600 and 650 metres (1,970 and 2,130 ft) in large areas of the local government. It is over 650 metres (2,130 ft) above mean sea level (a.m.s.l.) in some places, and below 500 metres (1,600 ft) in places that slope downward towards the river.

=== Weather and climate ===
Kaduna North lies completely in the part of Western Africa, well within the northern limit of the movement of the Intertropical Convergence Zone (ITCZ). It is characterized by two distinct seasonal regimes, oscillating between cool to hot dry and humid to wet season. With an estimated elevation of 650 metres (2,130 ft) above sea level, the LGA's landscape is primarily flat. The two main seasons that Kaduna North LGA experiences are the rainy and the dry seasons.

The postal code of the area is 800.

== Education ==
There are many educational institutions in Kaduna north that include both public and private, there are 160 primary schools belonging to the local government and 40 to private individuals which summed up to t0tal of 200 primary schools, and 13 secondary schools belonging to local government and 13 to private individuals. There are tertiary institutions that provide post secondary education in the local government, which include; Kaduna State University, Nigerian Defence Academy, Mando Advance College of Animal Science.

== Economy ==
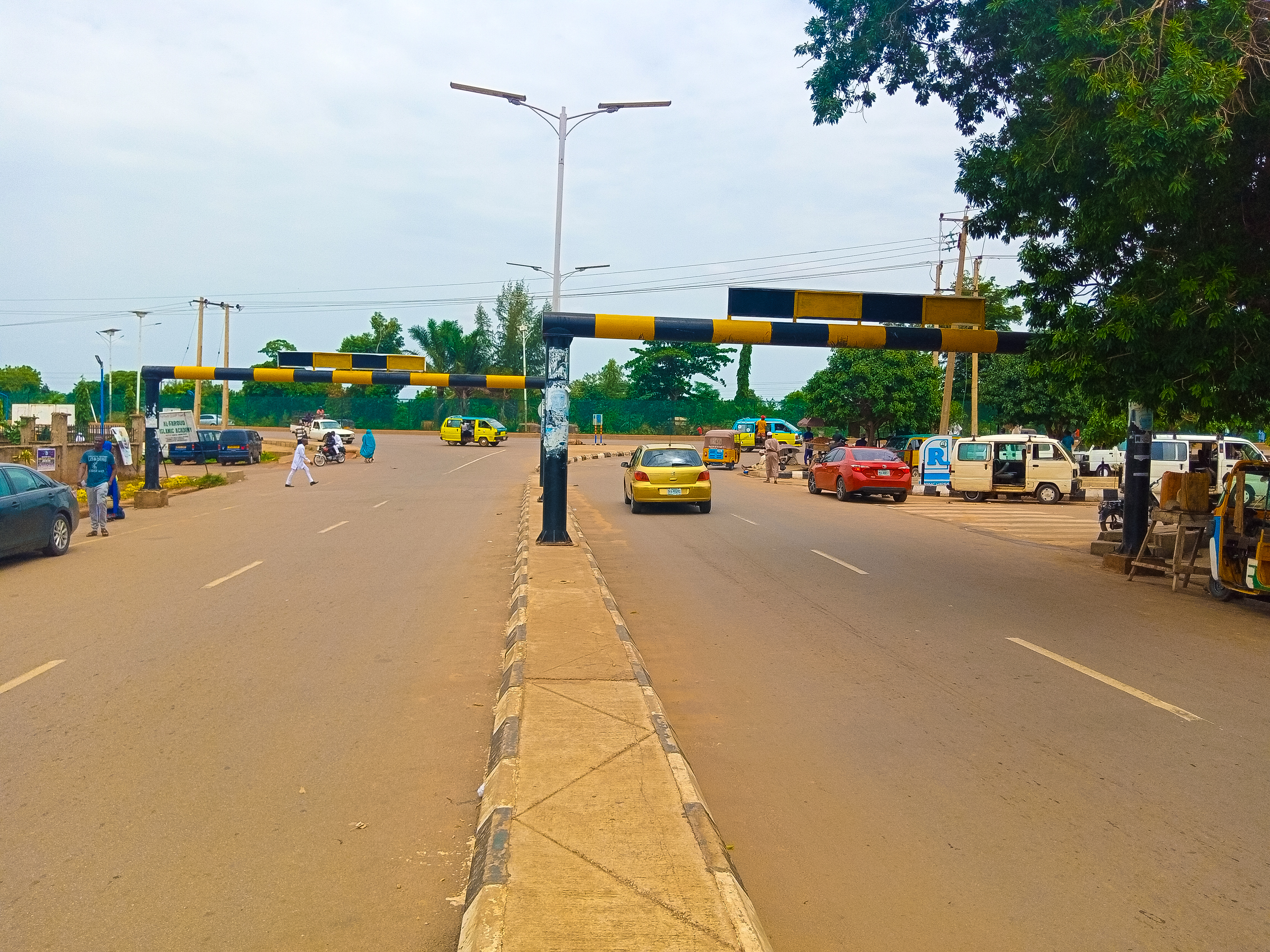
Road to Unuwan Dosa, part of Kaduna North

Kaduna north is the largest contributor to the Kaduna state economy, there are many small and large scale companies and industries with various commercial activities. The main market in the state is located there, Kaduna Central Market also known as Abubakar mahmud gumi market, others include Kasuwar Barci (sleeping market), Kawo weekly market, Ungwan rimi and Ungwan shanu weekly markets.

== Recreation ==
Leisure activity and entertainment centres are located at various places within the local government, there are two stadiums Ahmadu Bello Stadium and Ranchers Bees Stadium, a public square Murtala Square was a race course now a recreational facility that attracts people for leisure activities, so also there are many hotels, entertainment hubs and tourist attraction sites, which include ASAA Pyramid, Hamdala Hotel, Hotel Seventeen, Crystal Garden, Side Resort, Arewa House, and the national museum.

== Health Facilities ==
Kaduna North contains several healthcare facilities providing general, maternal, and specialist medical services across the local government area. Key institutions include Kaduna Clinic in Matali GRA, Albarka Hospital on Offa Road, and Lafiya Hospital on Ahmadu Bello Way, which offer general healthcare. Specialized and maternal care are available at Giwa Hospital and Specialist Clinic in Abakpa GRA and Rimi Clinics and Maternity in Unguwan Rimi. Additionally, Mega Hospital on Dutse Close provides medical services alongside health supplies and equipment..

== See also ==
- Kaduna South
- Southern Kaduna
