= Seyi Asagun =

Nigerian businesspeople

- Born: Kaduna State in Nigeria
- Occupation: Businessman

Seyi Asagun is a finance executive and the chief executive officer of Entourage Integrated Trust, a Microfinance Institution, a financial institution that provides funds to MSMEs in Nigeria.

== Early life and education ==
Seyi Asagun was born and raised in Kaduna State in Nigeria. In Kaduna Polythecnic, he obtained his Ordinary National Diploma (OND) in mathematics and statistics. After graduating from Kaduna Polythecnic, he went ahead to obtain diploma in marketing from the Nigerian Institute of Marketing of Nigeria. He is an alumnus of Obafemi Awolowo University where he obtained a bachelor's degree (BSc.) in Economics. Afterwards, he furthered his education by obtaining his MBA from Business School Netherlands (BSN). He was fortunate to serve as a corper during his National Youth Service Corps (NYSC) in Oceanic Bank (Now EcoBank) which set his career path in the Finance industry as he was retained by the bank after his service.

== Career and entrepreneurship ==
As mentioned earlier, his career and entrepreneurship journey started when he was retained as the after his service year at Oceanic Bank (Now EcoBank). During his stay at the Oceanic Bank, he ventured into the PET bottle manufacturing industry which closed down after three years of operation due to electricity issue.

In 2013, he took a bold leap to start lending money to small business owners which gave birth to Entourage Integrated Trust.

== Awards and recognition ==
In 2025, Obafemi Awolowo University conferred an award of Excellence on for his contribution to climate action, clean energy and sustainable finance.

Also, in that same 2025, he was named one of Nigeria's 65 Most Inspiring Business Leaders by the Guardian Newspaper when they were celebrating Nigeria at 65. He was officially honoured as one of the 40Under40 Nigeria's 100 Persons of the Year for his positive commitment and contributions MSMEs growth in Nigeria.
