= A125 highway (Nigeria) =

Road in Nigeria

Coordinates: 10.399045°N 6.387219°E

Trunk Road A125

Location
- Country: Nigeria

Highway system
- Transport in Nigeria

The A125 highway is a highway in Nigeria. It is one of the east-west roads linking the main south-north roads. (It is named from the two highways it links).

It runs from the A1 highway at Kontagora, Niger State to the A2 highway to the north of Kaduna.

== Cities ==
it crosses through multiple "cities", some of which include: Beri, Sabon Gari, Mariga, Tegina . It then takes a left turn and goes northeast towards Kaduna. Some "cities" include: Kagara, Gidan Karauku, Pan dongari, and Birnin Gwari, then it heads straight towards Kaduna crossing by a national park.
