= Ministries of Kaduna State =

Ministries in Kaduna State, Nigeria

- State
- Nicknames: Centre of Learning
- Location of Kaduna State in Nigeria
- Coordinates: 10°20′N 7°45′E
- Country: Nigeria
- Established: 27 May 1967
- Capital: Kaduna

Government
  - Governor: Uba Sani (APC)
  - Deputy Governor: Hadiza Sabuwa Balarabe

Area
  - Total: 46,053 km^{2} (17,781 sq mi)
  - Rank: 4th of 36
- Time zone: UTC+01 (WAT)
- postal code: 8000014
- ISO 3166 code: NG-KD
- Website: Kaduna State Ministries

Ministries of Kaduna State are official branches legally approved by the state government for carrying a specific project inside Kaduna State. The ministries are govern by appointed commissioners by the state governor and approved by the State House of Assembly.. In 2019 the governor of the state Nasir Ahmad el-Rufai cut down the rate of ministries from 19 to 14 ministries. The governor signed an executive order to create another three new ministries apart from the old ones.

== Ministries ==
The governor of the state made a new structure, He signed an Executive Order to create and restructure ministries in Kaduna State. The order abolishes the Ministry of Commerce, Industry & Tourism, the Ministry of Rural & Community Development and the Ministry of Water Resources. It amends the mandates of the ministries responsible for local government, women and social development, works and sports.

s/n	Ministry	Commissioner	Websites
1	Ministry of Agriculture	Murtala Dabo	Kaduna State Ministry of agriculture
2	Planning and Budget Commission	Mukhtar Ahmed	Kaduna State Ministry of budget
3	Ministry of Business, Innovation and Technology	Patience Fakai	Kaduna State Ministry of commerce
4	Ministry of Education	Prof. Mohammed Sani Bello	Kaduna State Ministry of education
5	Ministry of Environment and Natural Resources	Abubakar Buba	Kaduna State Ministry of Environment
6	Ministry of Finance	Shizzer Nasara Joy Bada	Kaduna State Ministry of finance
7	Ministry of Justice	Sani Shuaibu	Kaduna State Ministry of justice
8	Ministry of Health	Ummi Kaltume Ahmed	Kaduna State Ministry of health
9	Ministry of Local Government and Chieftaincy Affairs	Sadiq Mamman Lagos	Kaduna State Ministry of local government
10	Ministry of Internal Security and Home Affairs	Overseeing Commissioner: Samuel Aruwan	Kaduna State Ministry of rural
11	Ministry of Housing and Urban Development	Aminu Abdullahi Shagali	Kaduna State Ministry of water
12	Ministry of Human Services and Social Development	Salisu Rabi	Kaduna State Ministry of women
13	Ministry of Public Works and Infrastructure	Arc (Dr.) Ibrahim Hamza	Kaduna State Ministry of works
14	Ministry of Sports Development	Prof. Benjamin Kumai Gugong	Kaduna State Ministry of youth
