= Kaduna State =

State of Nigeria

Kaduna
- State
- Seal
- Nicknames: Centre of Learning
- Location of Kaduna State in Nigeria
- Coordinates: 10°20′N 7°45′E
- Country: Nigeria
- LGAs: 23
- Date created: 27 May 1967
- Capital: Kaduna

Government
  - Body: Government of Kaduna State
  - Governor: Uba Sani (APC)
  - Deputy Governor: Hadiza Sabuwa Balarabe
  - Legislature: Kaduna State House of Assembly
  - Chief Judge: Tukur Mu’azu
  - National Assembly delegation: Senators: C: Lawal Adamu Usman (PDP) N: Khalid Ibrahim Mustapha (PDP) S: Sunday Marshall Katunɡ (PDP); Representatives: List

Area
  - Total: 46,053 km^{2} (17,781 sq mi)
  - Rank: 4th of 36

Population (2006 census)^{1}
  - Total: 6,113,503
  - Estimate (2022): 9,032,200
  - Rank: 4th of 36
  - Density: 132.75/km^{2} (343.82/sq mi)

GDP (PPP)
  - Year: 2021
  - Total: $27.88 billion 11th of 36
  - Per capita: $2,905; 14th of 36
- Time zone: UTC+01 (WAT)
- postal code: 8000014
- ISO 3166 code: NG-KD
- HDI (2022): 0.545 low · 24th of 37
- Website: kdsg.gov.ng

Kaduna (Hausa: Jihar Kaduna, جىِهَر كَدُنا; مدينة كدونا; Fula: Leydi Kaduna, 𞤤𞤫𞤴𞤣𞤭 𞤳𞤢𞤣𞤵𞤲𞤢; Tyap: A̱byin Ka̱duna) is a state in the northwest geopolitical zone of Nigeria. The state capital is its namesake, the city of Kaduna, which was the 8th largest city in the country as of 2006. Created in 1967 as North-Central State, which also encompassed the modern Katsina State, Kaduna State achieved its current borders in 1987. Kaduna State is the fourth largest and third most populous state in the country, Kaduna State is nicknamed the Centre of Learning, owing to the presence of numerous educational institutions of importance within the state such as Ahmadu Bello University, Nigerian Defence Academy, Air Force Institute of Technology (AFIT), Kaduna Polytechnic, etc.

Modern Kaduna State is home to the sites of some of Africa's oldest civilizations, including the Nok civilization that prospered from c. 1500 BC to c. 500 AD. In the 9th century, geographer and historian Ya'qubi documented the existence of the Hausa Kingdoms, which existed until the region was incorporated into the Sokoto Caliphate in the early 1800s. During the colonial era, the city of Kaduna was made the capital of Northern Nigeria Protectorate by British leadership.

The state economy is dependent on agriculture, especially cotton and groundnut production. In the modern era, Kaduna State has been the site of violent ethnic and religious conflict, with the 2002 Miss World riots in the state capital over purported blasphemy leading to around 250 deaths and the loss of homes for around 30,000.

== Etymology ==
The most widespread etymology for the word Kaduna is that it is a corruption of the Hausa plural for crocodile, kadduna, as there used to be many crocodiles in the Kaduna River.

Another version of the etymology of the name is a narrative linked to the Gbagyi word/name 'Odna' for the Kaduna River.

== History ==
Zazzau, a traditional state which lies within the province's capital, is said to have been founded in 1536. It would later be renamed to Zaria after the younger sister of Queen Amina. The Hausa people of Zaria & the Ham people of Jaba, are said to be the old ancestral of the region's north & south respectively.

It is indicative that the name, Kaduna, was taken up by Lord Frederick Lugard and his colonial colleagues when they moved the capital of the then Northern Region from Zungeru to Kaduna City in 1916. This move of the colonial office to Kaduna city started in 1912–1918/20, with the initial effort having been made in 1902 from Jebba to Zungeru.

At the start of British colonial rule in northern Nigeria, the people groups who lived in the area became 'Northern Nigerians'- a construct which continues even today. By 1967 these people groups were again carved into 'North Central State'; this was the case until 1975 when 'Kaduna State' was formerly created by the then military leader, Gen. Murtala Mohammed, with all distinct identities amalgamated into one state without a referendum. The state hence is the successor of the old Northern Region of Nigeria, which had its capital at Kaduna which is now the state capital of about 6.3 million people (Nigerian census figure, 2006).

In 1967, the old Northern Region was divided into six states in the north, leaving Kaduna as the capital of North-Central State, whose name was changed to Kaduna State in 1976. Meanwhile, Kaduna State was further divided in 1987, creating Katsina State. Under the governance of Kaduna are the ancient cities of Zaria, Kafanchan, and Nok. The most intriguing aspect of this area is that the colonial construction and its post-colonial successor called 'Nigeria' hardly documented the history or the method of how Kaduna State's people groups encompassed in these constructs define and identify themselves. As such, the people groups who populate the area have lived in near oblivion or obscurity as they are often thought of as Hausa people. In 2019 Kaduna State celebrated its 100th anniversary, making it one of the oldest states in Nigeria.

In 2021, Kaduna State was the site of several major attacks done by bandits involved in the Nigerian bandit conflict. On 24 February, at least 34 were killed in attacks in Kaduna and neighboring Katsina state. On 11 March, 39 students were kidnapped when gunmen attacked the Federal College of Forestry Mechanization. On 20 April, in another raid by bandits on Greenfield University students and staff, 22 were kidnapped and 6 of them were killed. On 5 July, a further 140 students were kidnapped from Bethel Baptist High School. Attacks have continued into 2022, 2023, and 2024.

== Geography ==
Kaduna River

The state is located in the Northern part of Nigeria's high plains. The vegetation cover is Sudan Savannah type, characterized by scattered short trees, shrubs and grasses. The soil is mostly loamy to sandy. A substantial amount of clay is found also.

Its northern half became Katsina state in 1987. The state is bordered by seven states: Zamfara for 117 km (73 miles) and Katsina for 161 km (100 miles) to the north, Kano to the north-east for 255 km, Bauchi for 32 km (20 miles) and Plateau to the east, Nasarawa for 169 km (105 miles) and Abuja Federal Capital Territory (for 45 km) to the south, and Niger to the west for about 468 km (291 miles). Kaduna state is located between latitude 10°38'58" N and 10°25'36" N and to longitude 7°22'14" E and 7°32'00" E.

The state was ranked number four by the total area of land and number three by population.

The Kaduna River, a tributary of the Niger River, flows through the state. There are rocky stones in Zaria and Kogoro Hill. Many communities are prone to seasonal flooding during the rainy season.

=== Climate ===
The rainy season in Kaduna is hot, humid, and cloudy, while the dry season is hot and partly cloudy. Throughout the year, the temperature rarely falls below 50 °F or rises above 102 °F, usually ranging between 55 °F and 95 °F.

== Government ==
The current governor of Kaduna State is legally under the control of Kaduna State Executives, Kaduna State House of Assembly and Kaduna State Judiciary. The current elected governor of the state is Senator Uba Sani and his deputy is Hadiza Sabuwa Balarabe. In the state there 14 ministries that operate with the state government to improve the state: Ministries of Kaduna State. Within each Ministry, there are multiple agencies with regulatory authority, such as the Kaduna State Environmental Protection Authority which oversees waste, water, and other environmental quality issues.

=== Local government areas ===
Kaduna State consists of 23 local government areas. They are:

s/n	Local government area	Zone	Total area km^{2} (sq mi)	Political chairman	Population density /km^{2} (/sq mi)
1	Birnin Gwari	C	6,257 (2,416)	Hon Salisu Isah	
2	Chikun	C	4,466 (1,724)	Engr. Salasi Nuhu Musa	
3	Giwa	C		Hon. Ahmad Sama’ila	
4	Igabi	C		Hon Sani Abdul	
5	Ikara	N		Hon Bashir Mamman Dogon-Koli	
6	Jaba	S		Hon. Larai Sylvia Ishaku	
7	Jema'a	S		Hon. Peter Tanko Dogara	
8	Kachia	S		Hon. Manzo Daniel Maigari	
9	Kaduna North	C		Hon. Muhammad Gambo	
10	Kaduna South	C	46.2 (17.8)	Hon. Rayyan Hussein ^{[58]}	11,799 (30,560)
11	Kagarko	S	2,356 (910)	Hon. Muhuyiddeen Abdullahi Umar	
12	Kajuru	C		Hon. Dauda Madaki	
13	Kaura	S		Hon. Sankyai Obadiah Sanko	
14	Kauru	S		Dr. Bashir Yanko Dawaki	
15	Kubau	N		Hon. Musa Saleh	
16	Kudan	N		Hon. Dauda Iliya Hunkuyi	
17	Lere	N		Jafaru Ahmed	
18	Makarfi	N		Hon Muhammad Garba	
19	Sabon Gari	N		Hon. Muhammad Abubakar	
20	Sanga	S		Hon. Anto Usman	
21	Soba	N		Hon. Muhammad Lawal Shehu	
22	Zangon Kataf	S		Hon. Bege Gaiya Joseph	
23	Zaria	N		Hon. Jamil Ahmad Muhammad	

== Economics ==
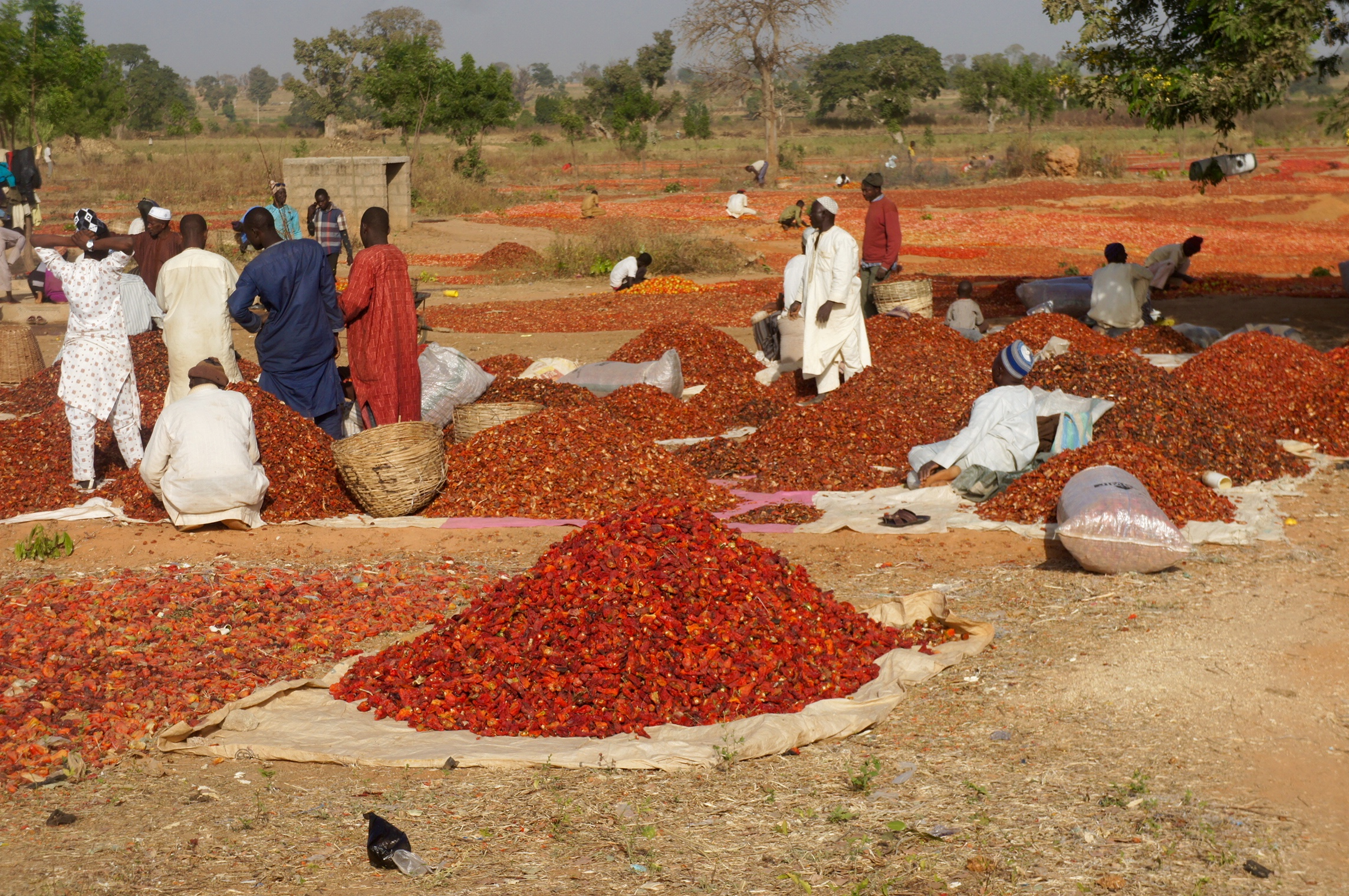
Sun-dried tomato and pepper farm, Hunkuyi, Kaduna State

The Kaduna State economy was ranked 15th largest state in the Nigerian economy from 2002 to 2008, and it made up 3.3% of Nigerian GDP. While agriculture contributed 30% of SGDP in Kaduna. Kaduna state cultivate cotton and peanuts (groundnuts) for exporting and domestic extraction of Peanut oil. In the state, there is the National Institute of Leather and Technology, to improve modern technology and traditional method.

== Services ==
=== Water ===
Kaduna State Rural Water Supply and Sanitation Agency was created by the state government to supply clean water to the rural parts of Kaduna State. It was created to address the need for clean water in rural areas of Kaduna State. Having being in existence for over 15 years, RUWASSA has always maintained its commitment of providing a clean water supply to the 23 local governments of the state. RUWASSA also encourages and welcomes partnerships from various local communities, traditional leaders, public and private sectors, NGOs, etc., to ensure that each project meets the specific needs of the host community. With an about 85% project success rate, RUWASSA has continued to demonstrate excellence in its projects, thereby delivering jobs with accountability and transparency. Also, it has about 1,200 water points with 24/7support availability.

=== Media ===
In Kaduna State, there are many means of communication through mass media, broadcasting, internet communication and banking transactions. In Kaduna State, there are 21 radio stations and more than 4 television stations broadcasting. Many of them are owned by the state government or federal government, and a few are private. The following is a list of radio stations in Kaduna:

s/n	Name (AM)	Frequency	Motto
1	Brila FM	88.9	
2	Kada 2 FM, Kaduna (KSMC)	89.9	
3	Rockside FM, Kafanchan (KSMC)	89.9	
4	Capital Sounds FM, Kaduna (KSMC)	90.9	
5	Liberty Radio (English) Kaduna	91.7	
6	Karama FM, Kaduna (FRCN)	92.1	Tumbin giwa
7	Freedom Radio FM, Kaduna	92.9	
8	Vision FM Kaduna	92.5	
9	FCE Zaria FM	93.7	
10	Queen FM, Zaria (KSMC)	94.1	
11	Supreme FM, Kaduna (FRCN)	96.1	
12	Alheri Radio FM, Kaduna	97.7	
13	ASU FM (Kaduna State University Radio)	98.5	
14	Invicta FM, Kaduna	98.9	
15	Human Right Radio Kaduna	99.9	
16	BU Samaru FM, Zaria	101.1	
17	Teachers Radio (Nigeria Institute of Teachers, NTI)	102.5	
18	Spider FM (Kaduna Polytechnic Radio)	102.7	
19	Liberty Radio (Hausa) Kaduna	103.1	Tashar Yanci
20	Ray Power FM Kaduna	106.5	
21	Demographics	106.5	

== Ethnic groups ==
Kaduna State is populated by about 59 to 63 different ethnic groups, if not more, with the exactitude of the number requiring further verification through fieldwork. The question as in the last paragraph with the Hausa and Fulani as the dominant ethnic groups followed by at least 60 others. These groups include:

S/N	Ethnic group	Origin	Area
1	Abinu (dubbed Binawa)		
2	Ada (dubbed Kuturmi)		
3	Adara (dubbed Kadara)		
4	Agbiri (dubbed Gure)		
5	Akurmi (labelled Kurama by the Hausa)		
6	Anghan (dubbed Kamanton by the Hausa)		
7	Amap (dubbed Amo by the Hausa)		
8	Aniragu (dubbed Kahugu)		
9	Aruruma		
10	Asholio (dubbed Moro'a)		
11	Atachaat (dubbed Kachechere)		
12	Atuku		
13	Atyap (dubbed Kataf by the Hausa)		
14	Ayu		
15	Bajju (dubbed Kaje by the Hausa)		
16	Bakulu (Ikulu by the Hausa)		
17	Bhazar (named Koro)		
18	Bur (Sanga)		
19	Dingi		
20	Fantswam (dubbed Kafanchan)		
21	Fulani		
22	Gbagyi-Gbari (Gwari in Hausa)	Southern Kaduna	
23	Gwandara		
24	Gwong (Kagoma in Hausa)		
25	Ham (dubbed Jaba in Hausa, which is a derogatory name)		
26	Hausa		
27	Ikulu		
28	Janji (dubbed Gwari by the Hausa)		
29	Kaivi (dubbed Kaibi)		
30	Kanufi		
31	Kanuri		
32	Kigono		
33	Kinugu		
34	Kitimi		
35	Kiwafa		
36	Kiwollo		
37	Koro		
38	Kubvori (dubbed Surubu)		
39	Mada (Mardan) Mada must have migrated during colonial rule		
40	Marghi	Borno	
41	Nandu		
42	Nduyah		
43	Numana		
44	Nindem		
45	Ningeshe		
46	Nikyop		
47	Ninzo		
48	Nyenkpa (Yeskwa)		
49	Oegworok (dubbed Kagoro)		
50	Pikal		
51	Pitti		
52	Ribang		
53	Rishuwa		
54	Rumada		
55	Ruruma		
56	Rumayya		
57	Shemawa		
58	Zaar (dubbed Siyawa; Bauchi state?)		
59	Takad (dubbed Attakar)		
60	Tarri		
61	Atsam (dubbed Chawai)		

== Religion ==
The main religions in Kaduna State are Islam and Christianity while some minority ethnic groups practice traditional worshipping, mostly in the southern area of the state. The people of Kaduna are very religious, causing two religious crises in 2001 and 2002, the Miss World riots.

== Languages ==
LGA	Languages
Birnin Gwari	Hausa, Fulani Acipa, Eastern; Gbagyi; Kamuku; Rogo; Shama-Sambuga
Chikun	Gbagyi,
Giwa	Hausa; Fulani
Igabi	Hausa,Gbagyi
Ikara	Hausa; Fulani
Jaba	Ashe; Duya; Hyam
Jema'a	Ashe; Berom; Duya; Fantswam; Gyong; Hyam; Jju; Kanufi; Mada; Kyoli; Nikyob-Kaninkon; Ninzo; Nungu; Nyankpa; Shamang; Tyap; Tyuku Zhire; Numana
Kachia	Adara; Doka; Gbagyi; Hyam; Iku-Gora-Ankwa; Ikulu; Jju; Nghan; Koro Wachi; Kuturmi; Shamang; Tyap; Zhire
Kaduna North	Hausa; Gbagyi
Kaduna South	Hausa; Gbagyi
Kagarko	Ashe; Duya; Gbagyi; Koro Wachi
Kajuru	Adara; Ajiya; Kuce; Gbagyi;
Kaura	Gworok; Iten; Takad; Sholyio; Tyap and Tyecarak (Tyecaat)
Kauru	Abisi; Bina; Dungu; Jere; Ikulu; Kaivi; Kinuku; Koono; Mala; Rigwe; Ruma; Sheni; T'kurmi; Tsam; Tumi; Tyap; Vono; and Vori
Kubau	Hausa; Fulani,T'kurmi
Kudan	Hausa; Fulani
Lere	T'kurmi,Amo; Bina; Janji; Lemoro; Sanga Tugbiri-Niragu
Makarfi	Hausa; Fulani
Sabon Gari	Hausa; Fulani
Sanga	Ahwai; Ayu; Bu; Gwandara; Hasha; Ninzo; Numana; Nungu; Sambe; Sha; Toro
Soba	Hausa, Fulani
Zangon Kataf	Ikulu; Jju; Nghan; Tyap; Tyecarak (Tyecaat)
Zaria	Hausa; Fulani

Other languages in Kaduna State are Bacama, Firan, and Sambe. Almost all of these languages are spoken in Southern Kaduna.

== Education ==
Kaduna is one of the largest centres of education in Nigeria. The slogan of the state is Center of Learning because of the presence of many institution like Ahmadu Bello University (established 1962). There are many government schools, include primary schools and secondary schools. All secondary schools in Kaduna are owned by the state government, federal government or private organisations. there are many tertiary institutions in the state. The state also has colleges for transportation and agriculture.

=== Universities and institutes ===
- Ahmadu Bello University, Zaria
- Air Force Institute of Technology (Nigeria)
- Federal College of Education, Zaria (now known as Federal University of Education, Zaria)
- Federal University of Applied Sciences Kachia (formerly Nok University Kachia)
- Greenfield University Kaduna
- Kaduna Polytechnic (1968), Kaduna
- Kaduna State University
- National Open University of Nigeria, Kaduna Study Center
- Nigerian College of Aviation Technology, Palladan Zaria
- Nigerian Defence Academy (NDA), Kaduna
- Nuhu Bamalli Polytechnic, Zaria

=== Secondary schools and colleges ===
- Barewa College
- Command Secondary School
- Essence International School
- Nigerian Military School
- Nigerian Tulip International Colleges
- Adeyemo college
- Air force secondary school
- Destiny college
- FGC, Kaduna

== Transportation ==
Federal Highways are:

- A2 north from Abuja FCT at Sabon Wuse for 294 km as the Abuja-Kaduna-Zaria Expressway via Kaduna and Zaria to Kano State as the Kaduna-Kano Rd or Zaria Rd at Gidan Mallam Idi (part of the African Unity Road or Trans-Sahara Highway or Trans African 2: TAH2),
- A3 northeast from Nasarawa State at Barimaw for 75 km as the Makurdi-Jos Rd to Plateau State at Jenta,
- A11 east from A2 at Katabu for 99 km to A236 at Pambeguwa,
- A125 east from Niger State at Gishiri for 123 km to A2 north of Kaduna,
- A126 northwest from A236 in Zaria for 56 km as the Zaria-Funtua Rd to Katsina State at Gangara,
- A235 southeast from A2 south of Kaduna for 245 km via Doka, Gumel and Kafanchan to A3 at Nimbia Forest Reserve,
- A236 southeast from A2 at Zaria for 181 km as the Zaria-Pambeguwa Rd to Plateau State at Jengre as the Pambeguwa-Jengre Rd.

Other major roads include:

- the Dan Dume-Birnin Gwai Rd north from A125 via Malam Mudi to Katsina State at Ungwan Chitumu,
- the Malam Mudi-Zaria Rd east to A2,
- the Makarf-Gubuchi Rd southeast from A2 at Mai-Rijiya as the Ikara-Kargi Rd to Babinda on A236 as the Babinda-Nasari-Damau Rd,
- south from A236 at Kubanni via Wuchichiri, Matari and Dan Jaba to A11 at Tama B,
- the Tarau-Sabon Birni Rd north from A236 at Jaja to Bauchi State at Agaji,
- the Lidin-Doka-Gidan Sarkin Rd south from A236 at Jaja via Lere and Doka to the Garun Kuama-Pari Rd via Mariri, Damakasuwa and Zaman Dabo to Samaru,
- the Kagoro-Samaru-Pari Junction Rd continues south from Samaru to A235 at Kagoro,
- the Kachia-Zonkwa Rd east from A235 at Gumel via Fadan Kamantan, and Zonkwa to Samaru to Manchok
- the Jos-Kafanchan Rd east from Manchok to Plateau State,
- west from A2 at Gidan Bahagu to Niger State at Gidan Wakili,
- southwest from A2 at Dutsi Hill to Niger State near Rijana.

Railways: the 1435 mm Lagos-Kano Standard Gauge Line is complete from Abuja via Minna in Niger State to Rigasa Station in Kaduna (2016), replacing part of the 1067 mm Cape gauge Western Line which continues north via Kano to Nguru. Kaduna is also connected by the Linking Line to Kafanchan with the Cape Gauge Eastern Line north from Lafia in Nasarawa State to Jos in Plateau State.

Airports: Kaduna International Airport (1982).

== Architecture ==
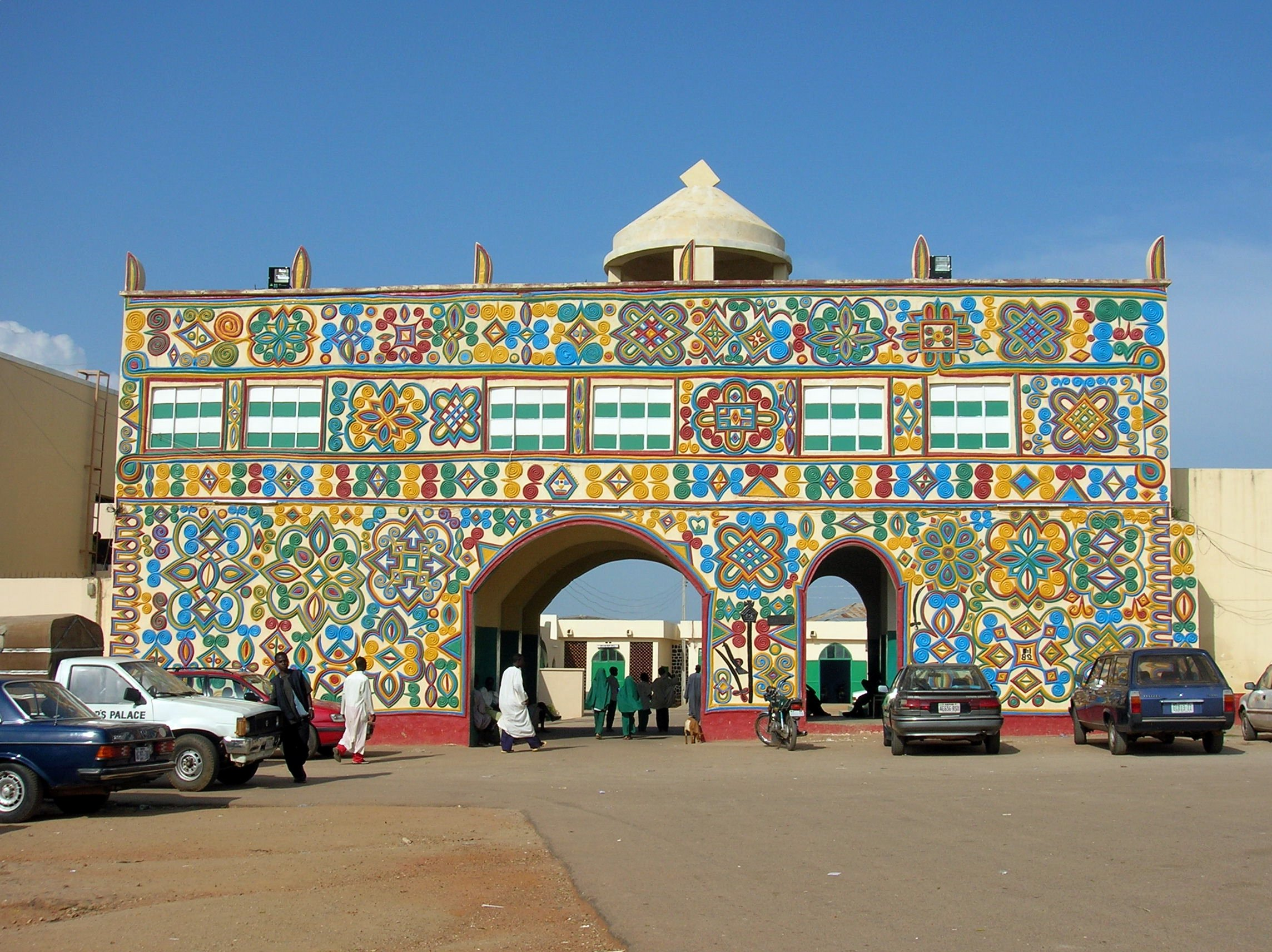
The entrance gate of Zazzau

Architecture includes the National Museum which was built in 1975 with archaeological and ethnographic exhibitions, the Kajuru Castle, Lugard Hall, Zaria walls and gates and Nok settlements. In the state there are many architectural buildings like Ahmadu Bello Stadium, Murtala Square, Investment house, Kaduna central market, and Sultan Bello Mosque. The palace of empire of Zazzau is one of the oldest traditional buildings in Kaduna state.

=== Traditional architecture ===
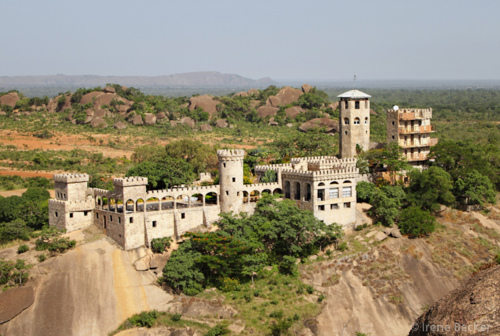
Kajuru castle

In Kaduna State there are a lot of ethnic groups, which lead to the variation of culture and architectural style, this include the city wall of Zaria. The walls constructed during the reigns of Queen Amina of Zazzau protected the city and they are between 14 and 16 km long, and are closed by eight gates, Also the Emir's Palace of Zaria is an important traditional heritage. The palace has luxurious interiors. The St. Bartholomew's Church Zaria, built by the Church Missionary Society in 1929, still stands in Zaria, the church was built based on Hausa traditional architecture.

=== Modern architecture ===
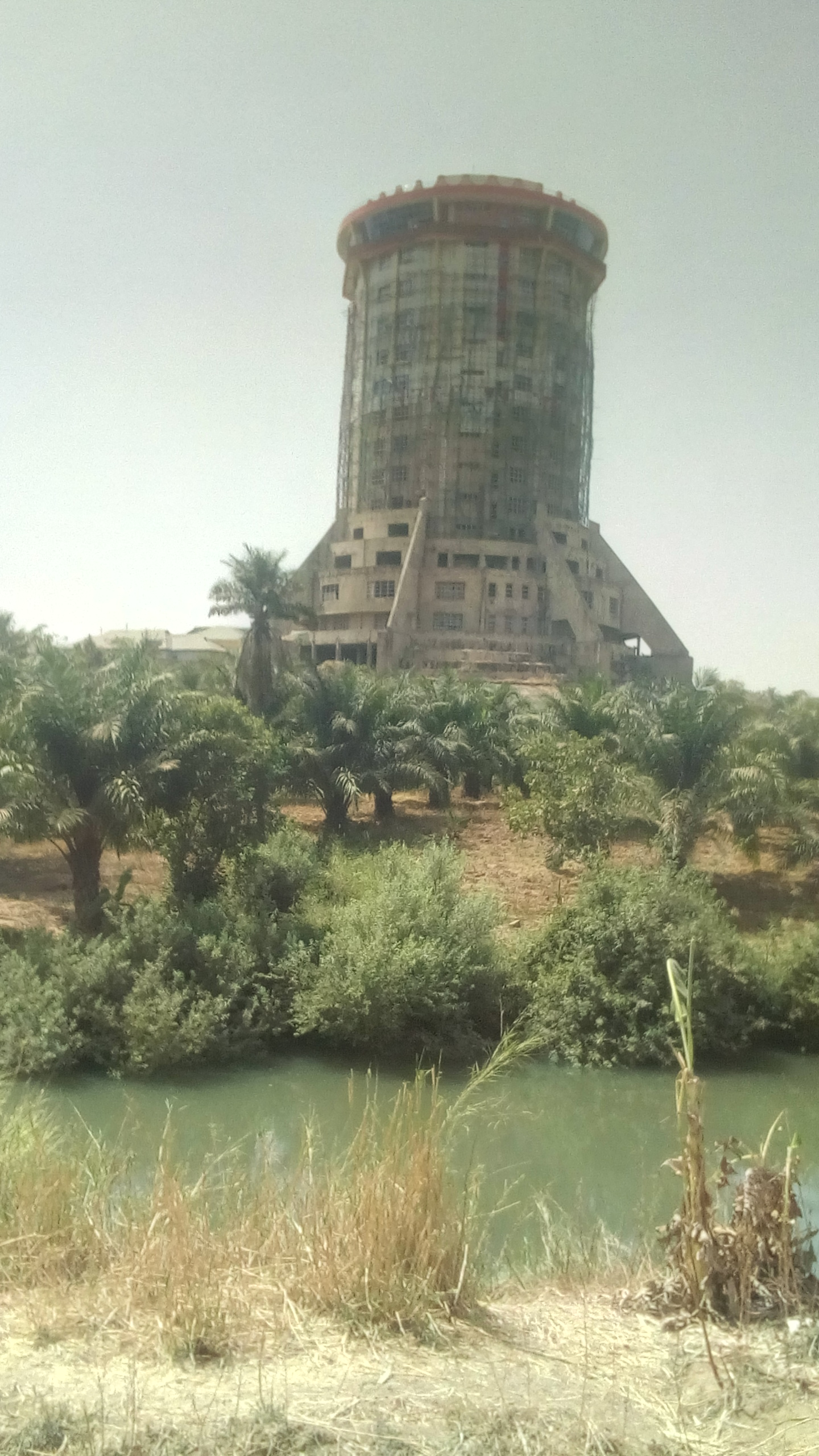
Throneroom's Salama radio 14-storey tower, Kafanchan

Modern architecture is present in the state as a result of civilization and development. Most of these architectural buildings were built by the federal or state government, while the residential ones are mostly built by individuals; these buildings include Ahmadu Bello Stadium, Ten storey building, Investment house, federal secretary, Ranchers Bees Stadium, and Murtala square.

== Health ==
Kaduna State has over 1,000 primary healthcare facilities to cater to every resident, even in the most remote village or ward of the state. To further improve on healthcare delivery, in 2016, the Kaduna State Government partnered with the UK Department for International Development (DFID) to install over 1.3 megawatts of solar power in primary healthcare facilities across the state.

== Sports ==
In Kaduna State many sports are played, such as football, golf, swimming, traditional wrestling and handball. The Kaduna State government runs a football club called Kaduna United F.C. The club participated in playing Nigerian Professional Football League but are under relegation. The state also hosts the Kaduna Marathon.

== Entertainment and tourism ==
In Kaduna State an annual festival is organized by Ministry of Culture and Tourism (Kaduna State). The festival exposes folklore talent and through these process, to promote unity and encourage tourism and build culture in the State. It takes place every November or December. Cultural activities include Eid al-Fitr and Eid al-Adha performed by the Muslims in the state; the Tuk Ham; the Afan National Festival; the Christmas and Easter celebrations, by Christians, and the Kallan-Kowa celebrations. Kaduna has a museum and a park, the Kofar Gamji park and Zoo. Lord Lugard's Residence, is also a tourist attraction and it currently houses the state assembly.

=== Festivals ===
- Eid al-Fitr and Eid al-Adha: This celebration is scheduled on the 1st of Shawwal and the 10th of Dhu al-Hijjah respectively according to the Islamic Calendar for three days usually in Kaduna, Usually, Muslims all over the world celebrate the end of the Ramadan fasting period and the conclusion of the hajj (pilgrimage) rites. Most of the emirates in Kaduna State and other parts of the northern Emirates celebrate it with a colourful Hausa traditional dressing, horse decoration and Durbar.
- Christmas celebrations: This takes place in every 25/26 December in Kaduna State to celebrate the birth of Jesus Christ by Christians all over the state.
- Easter celebrations: It takes place every March/April to remember the death and resurrection of Jesus Christ by all Christians in Kaduna State.
- Afan National Festival: This is a celebration on every 1 January, in Kagoro. The festival has assumed an international standard with the sons and daughters of Agworok land coming together to discuss issues that required their attention and to show their extreme cultural heritage.
- Kalankuwa Cultural festival is a purely cultural festival that is celebrated in northern part of the state. It is a celebration to give thanks for good farm crops and to celebrate the season. It is celebrated in November/December. Young men and women come together in a peaceful manner to entertain themselves. It is celebrated in Bomo Village, Samara, in Sabon Gari local government area.

Other small festivals include the following:

- Batadon Festival
- Ayet Atyap annual cultural festival
- Durbar Festival
- Kaduna State Festival of Arts and Culture
- Kafanchan Day
- Kalankuwa Cultural Festival
- Moro’a Cultural Festival
- Ninzo Cultural Festival
- Zunzuk Dance
- Tuk-Ham Festival
- Unum-Akulu Festival

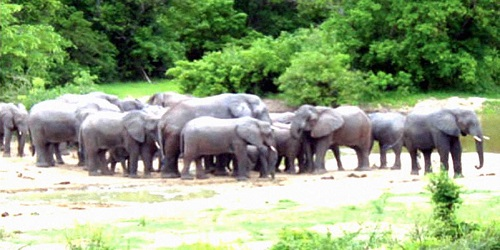
Kamuku Park, a tourism attraction

=== Tourism ===
- Kamuku National Park
- Matsiriga Waterfalls
- Kajuru Castle
- Arewa House
- Murtala Square

== Notable people ==
- Umar Farouk Abdulmutallab
- Bashir Abubakar
- Katung Aduwak
- Martin Luther Agwai
- Seyi Asagun, finance executive
- Gwamna Awan
- Amina Mohammed Baloni
- Harrison Bungwon
- Bala Ade Dauke
- Joe El
- Maiwada Galadima
- Ahmad Abubakar Gumi
- Chris Delvan Gwamna
- Shehu Idris
- Balarabe Abbas Lawal
- Toure Kazah-Toure
- Matthew Hassan Kukah
- Danjuma Laah
- Zamani Lekwot
- Audu Maikori
- Ahmed Makarfi
- Jonathan Gyet Maude
- Abdulkadir Balarabe Musa
- Christopher Gwabin Musa
- Nasir Ahmad el-Rufai (born February 1960) Nigerian Politician and former Kaduna State Governor from 2015 to 2023.
- Namadi Sambo (born 1954) Nigerian politician and former Vice President of Nigeria from 2010 to 2015.
- Tagwai Sambo
- Shehu Sani
- Uba Sani (born 1970) Nigerian politician and Governor of Kaduna State since 2023.
- Ishaya Shekari
- Aisha Ahmad Suleiman
- Sheikh Dahiru Usman
- Patrick Yakowa
- Andrew Yakubu
- Mukhtar Ramalan Yero (born 1968) Nigerian politician, deputy Governor of Kaduna State (2010–2012) and Governor of Kaduna State (2012–2015).
- Luka Yusuf
- Ibrahim Zakzaky
- Muhammad Auwal Albani Zaria ( Sept. 1960 to Feb. 2014) Nigerian Islamic scholar.

== Gallery ==
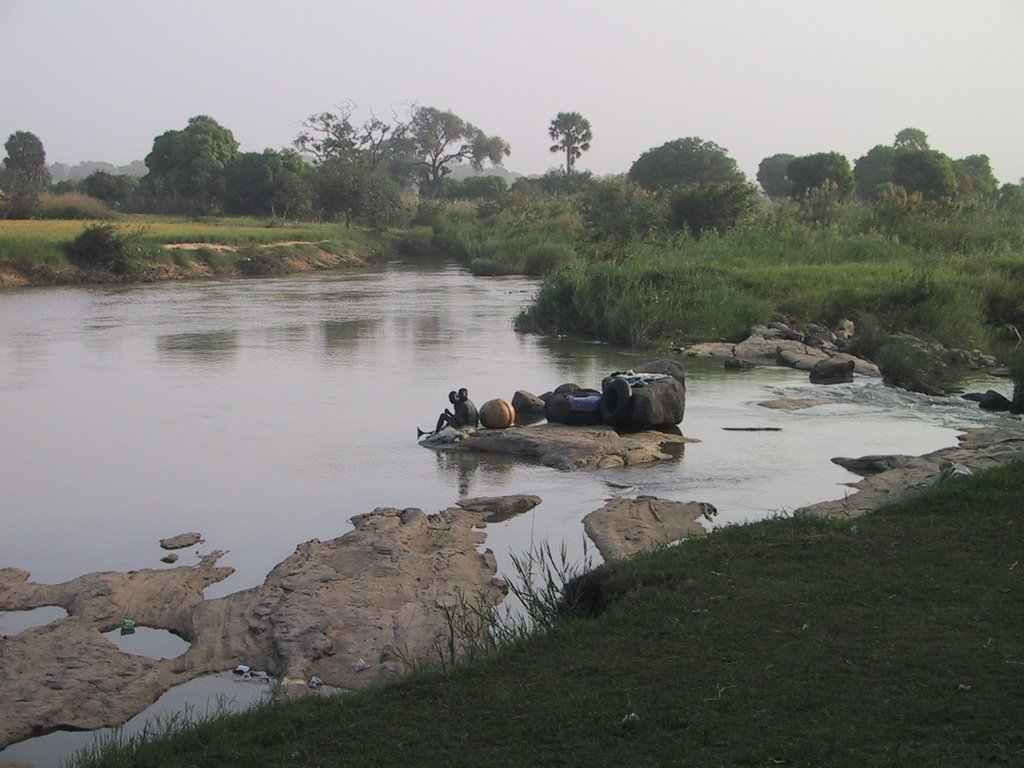
River Kaduna

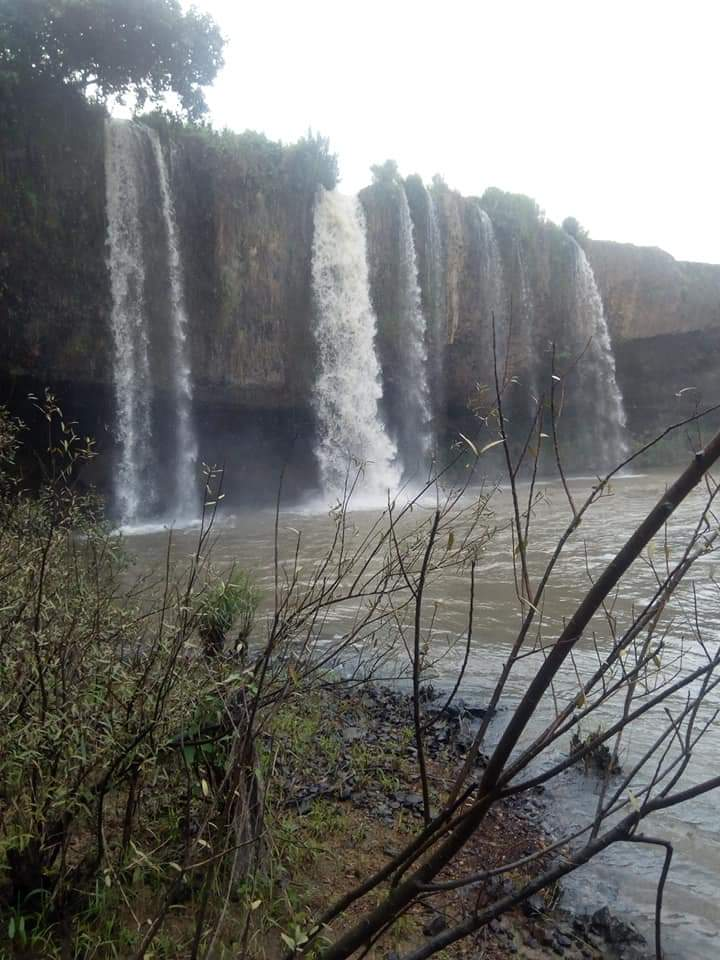
Waterfalls in Kafanchan

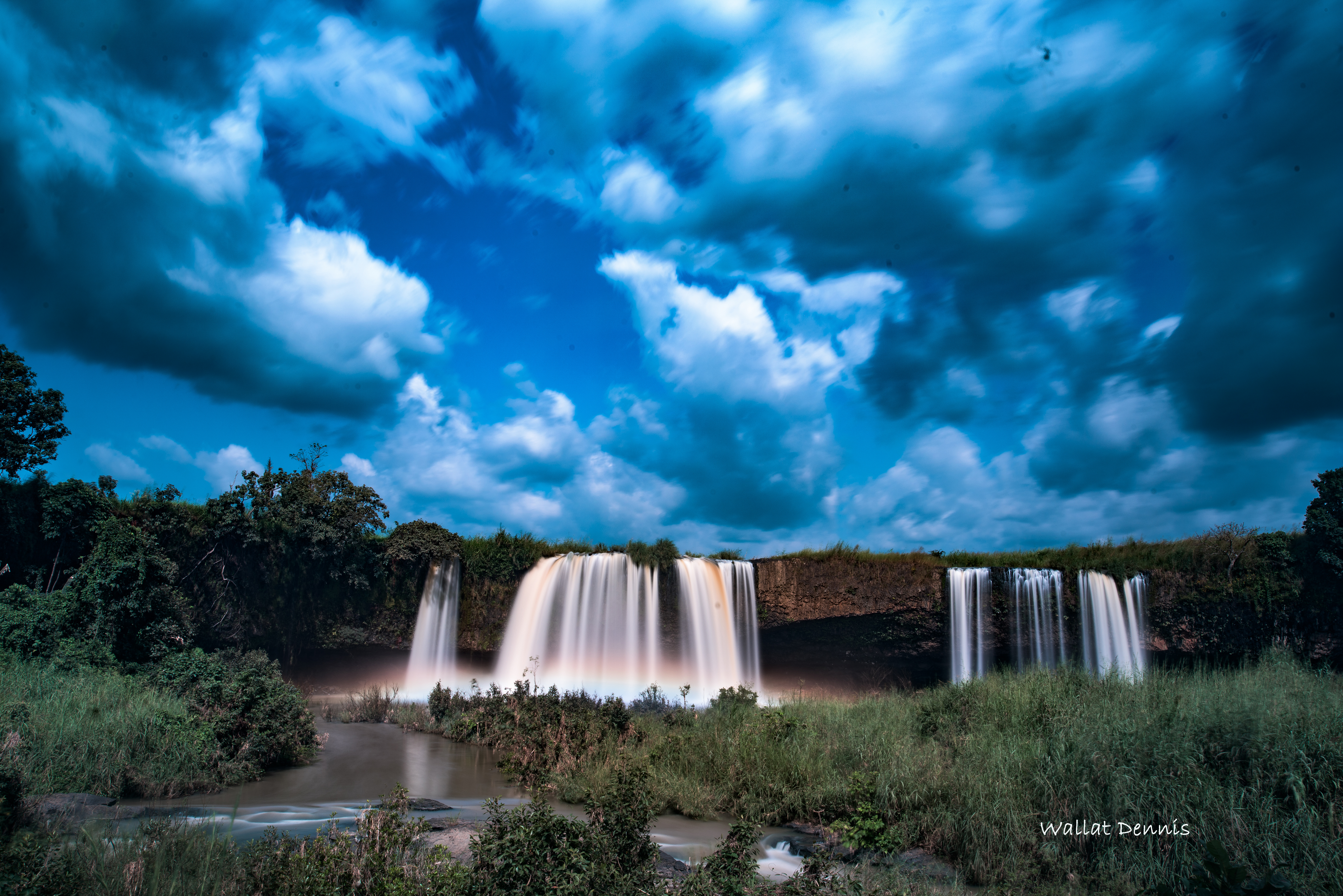
Matsirga waterfalls Kaduna

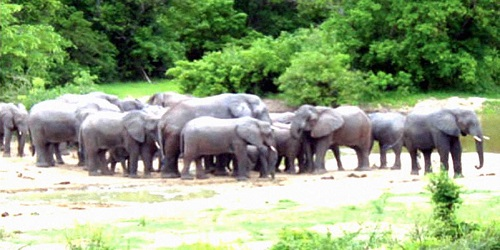
Kamuku National Park Kaduna

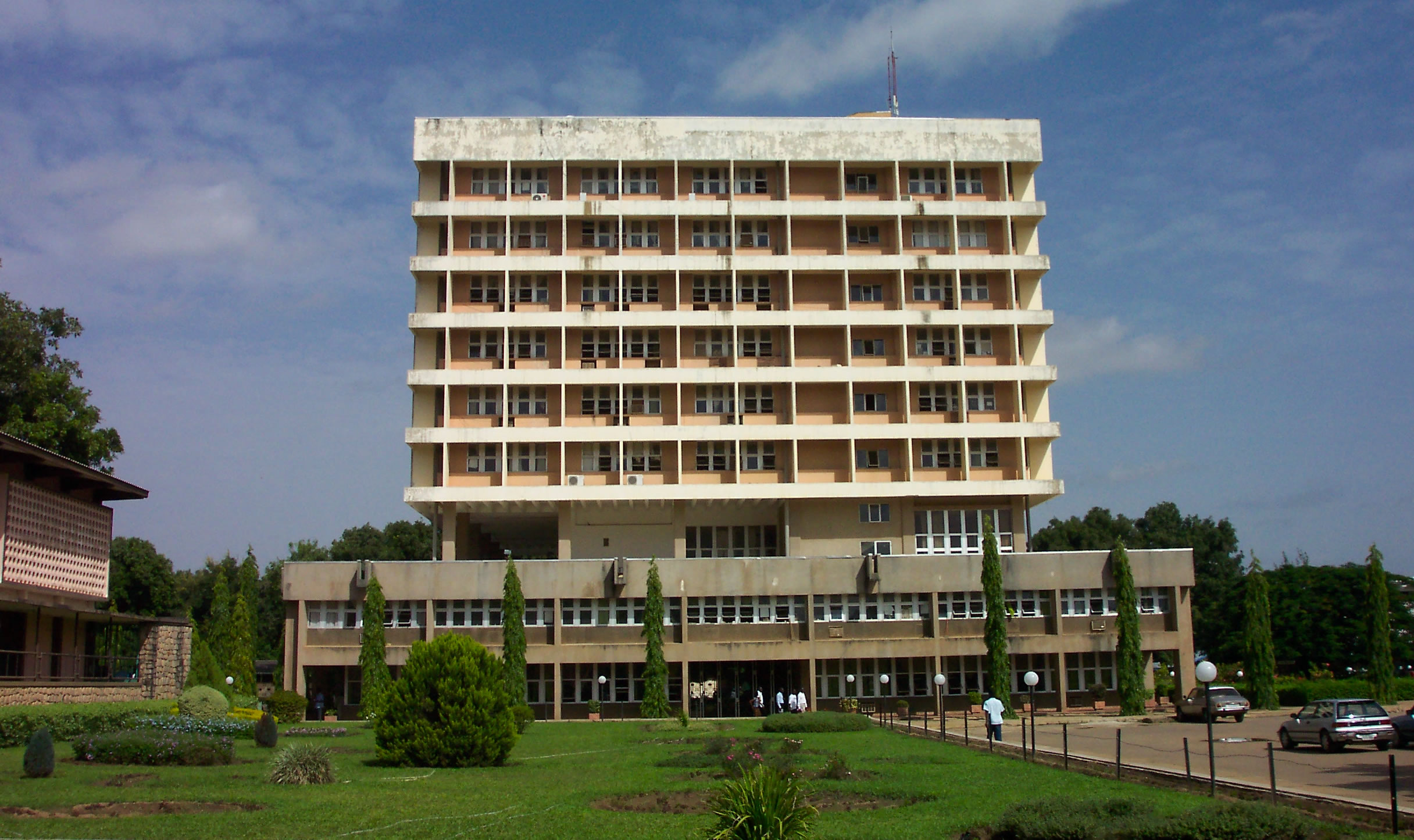
ABU senatorial building

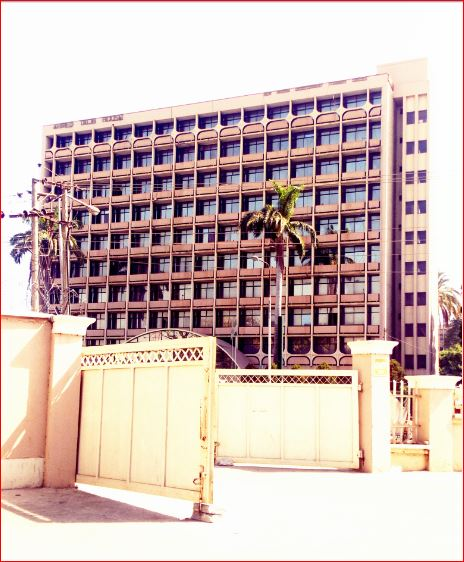
Ten Storey Building in Ahmadu Bello way Kaduna

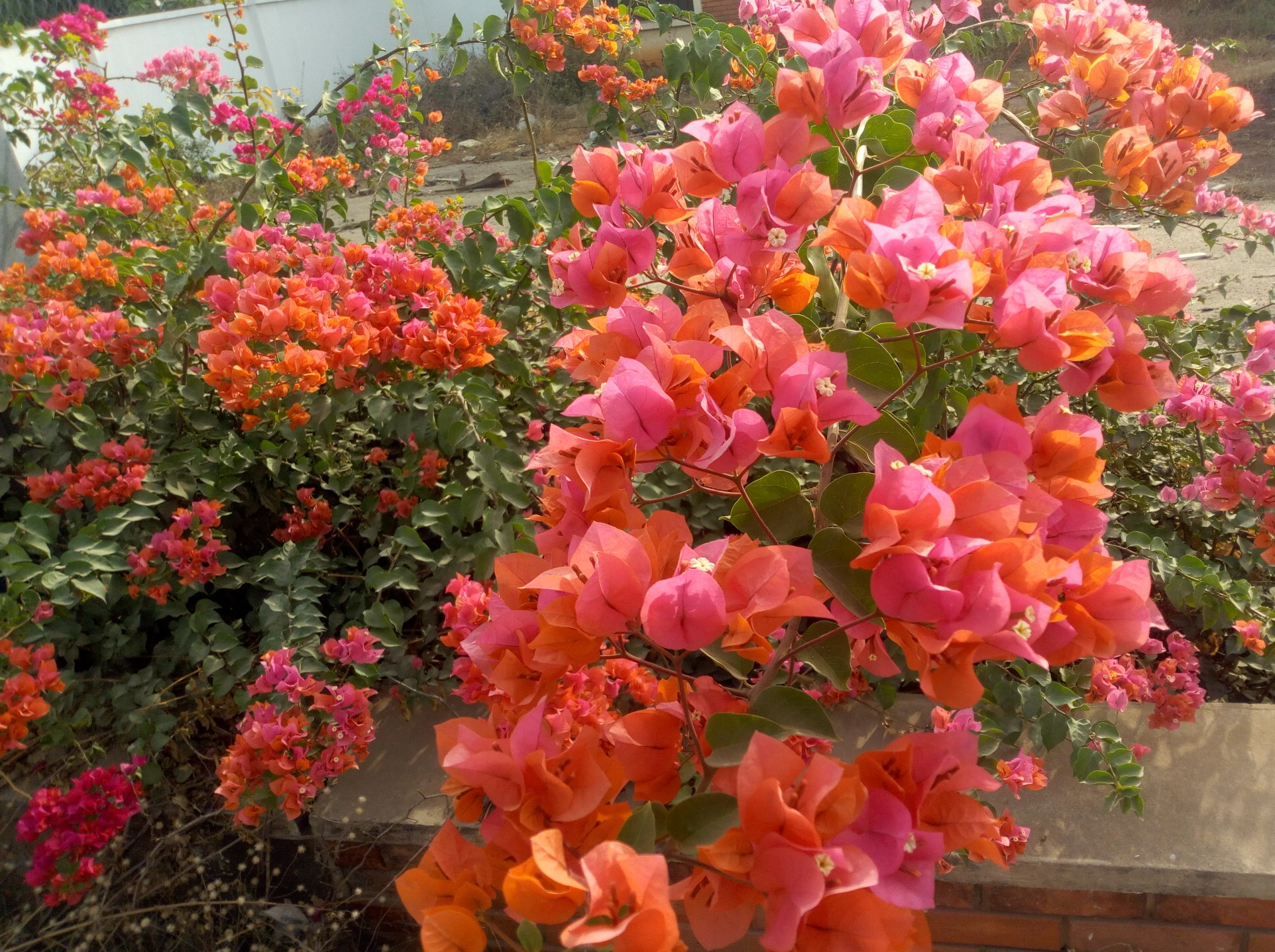
Major planted flower

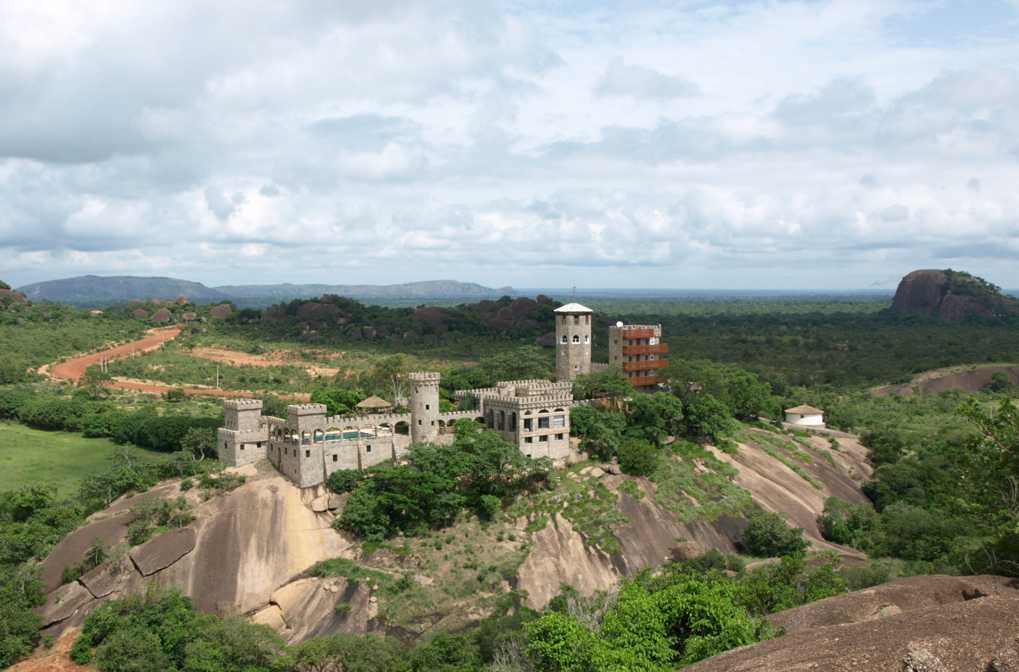
Kajuru Castle

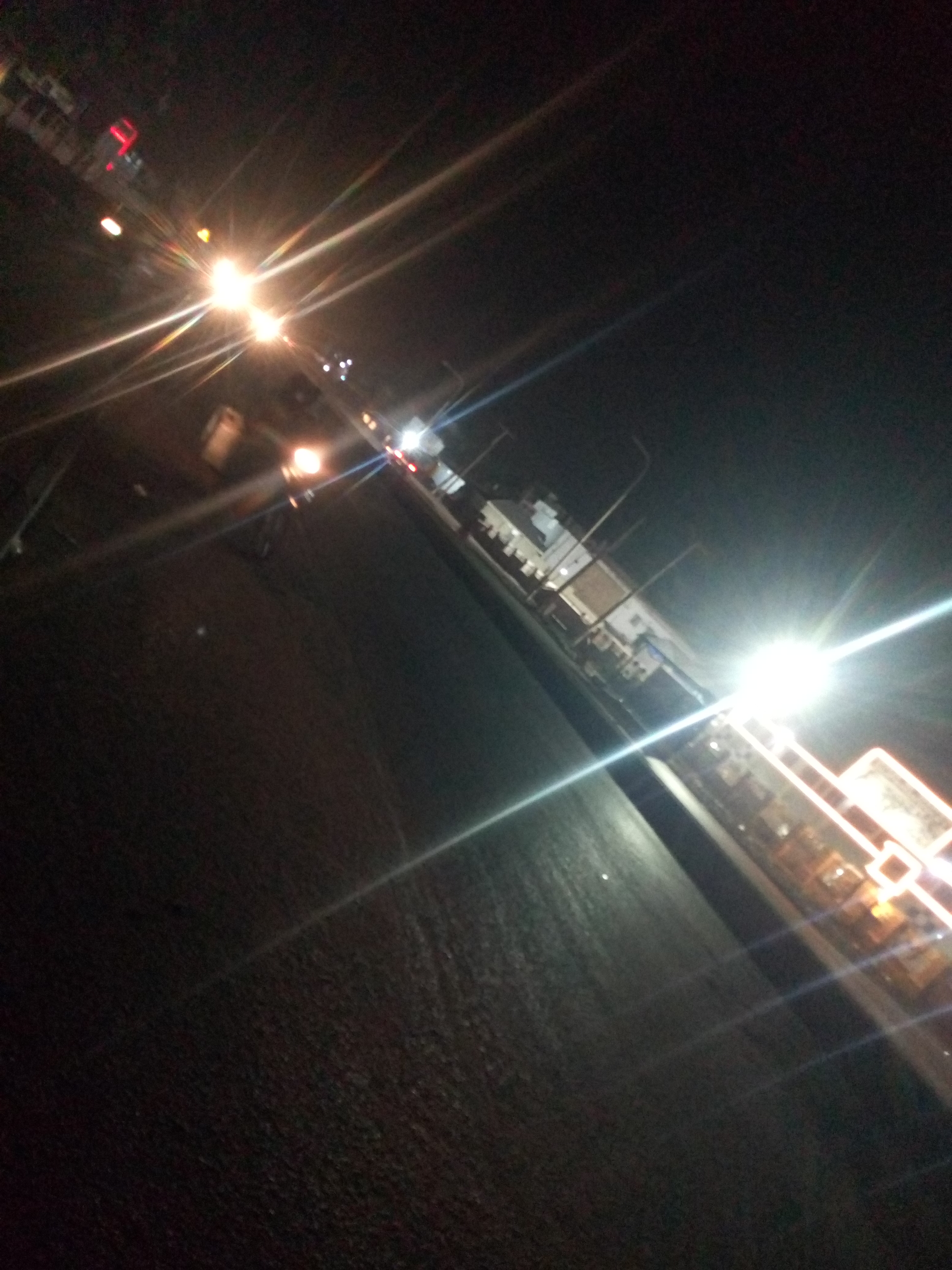
Night mode transportation in Kaduna city

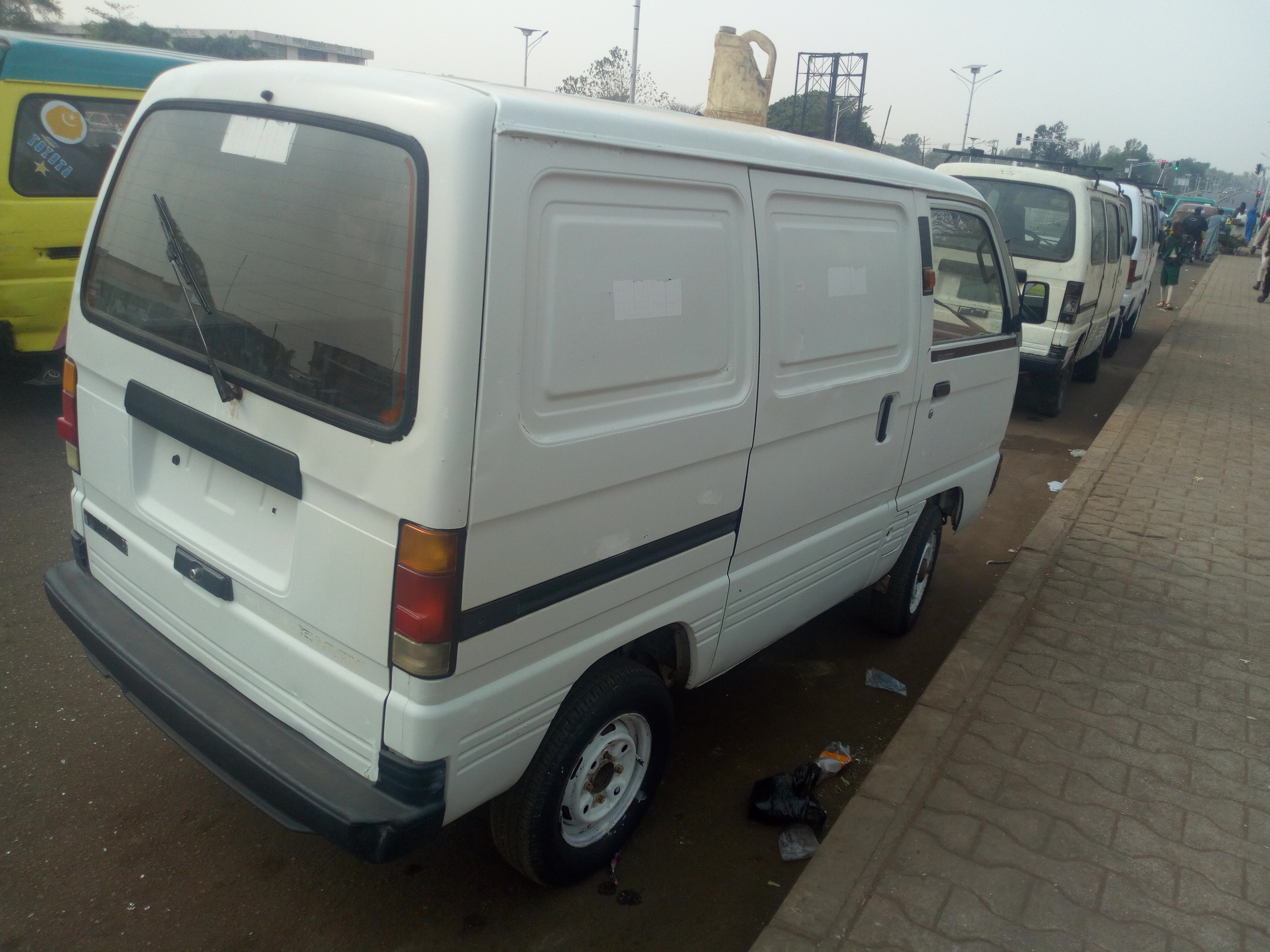
Kaduna city bus

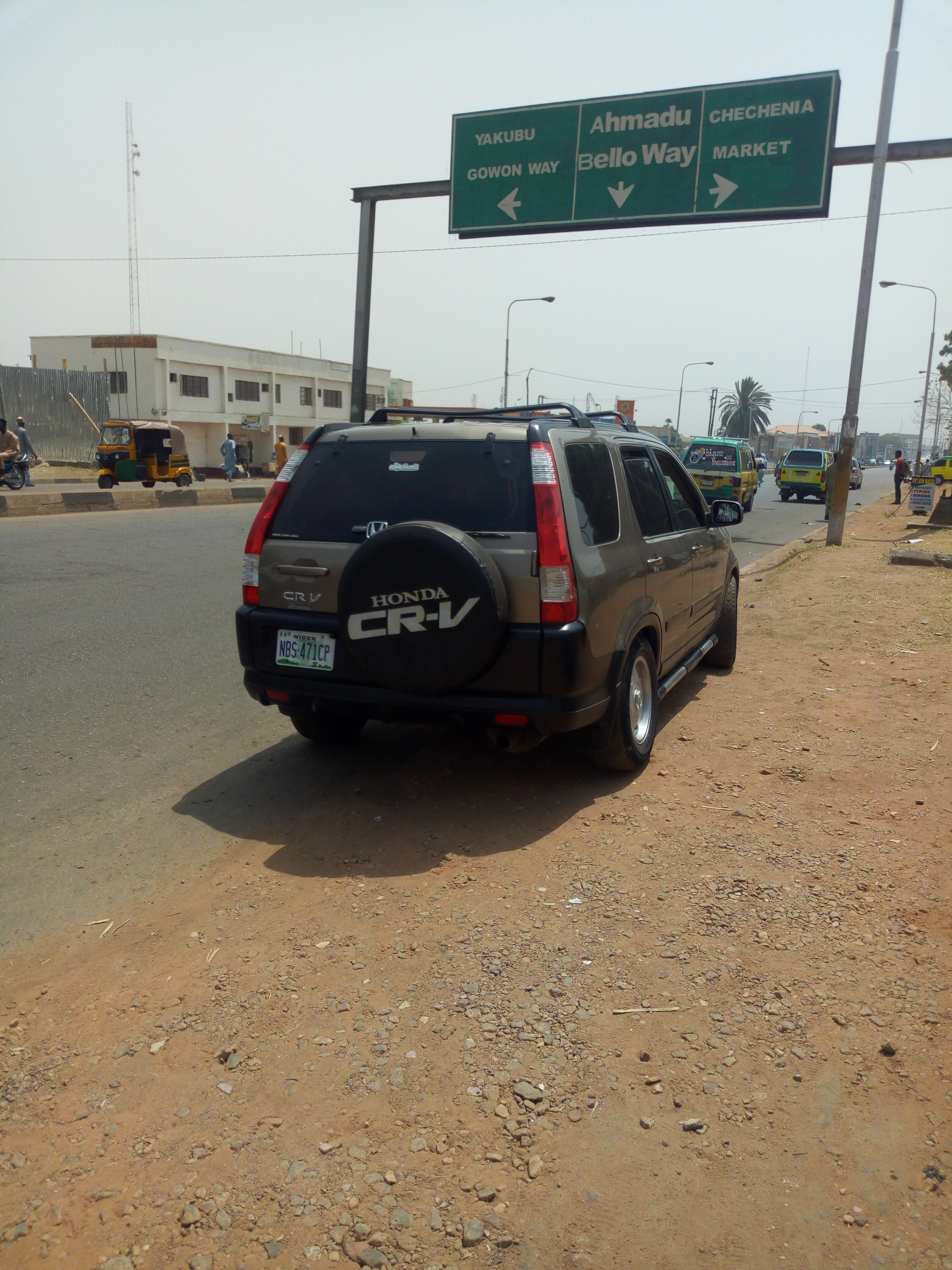
Ahmadu Bello way in the city of Kaduna

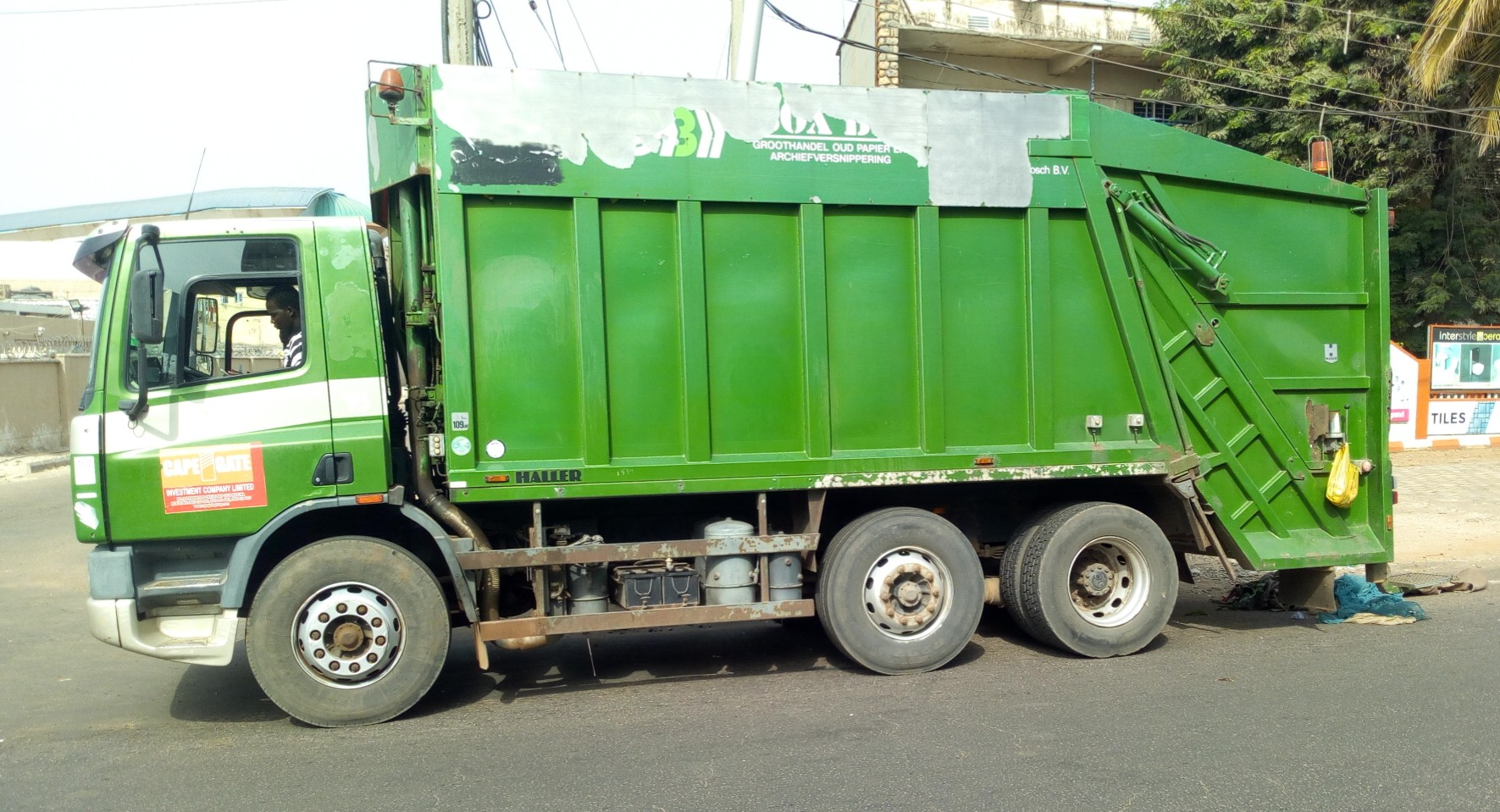
Green car in Kaduna city

== Politics ==
The state government is led by a democratical elected governor who works closely with members of the state's house of assembly. The capital city of the state is Kaduna

=== Electoral system ===
The governor of each state is selected using a modified two-round system. To be elected in the first round, a candidate must receive the plurality of the vote and over 25% of the vote in at least two -third of the State local government Areas. If no candidate passes threshold, a second round will be held between the top candidate and the next candidate to have received a plurality of votes in the highest number of local government Areas.

== See also ==
- Kaduna
- Kaduna State Governor
- Kaduna State House of Assembly
- Kaduna State Judiciary
- Ministries of Kaduna State
- Kaduna United F.C.
- Southern Kaduna
- Kaduna kidnapping (disambiguation)

== Sources ==
- Nigeria Congress
- Nigeria Exchange
