= Killings in Southern Kaduna =

21st-century mass killings by Fulani extremists in Nigeria

- Part of the Southern Kaduna crisis and the Nigerian bandit conflict
- Location: Southern Kaduna, Nigeria
- Date: 2011–2023
- Target: Southern Kaduna indigenous peoples
- Attack type: Organized murder, kidnapping, ransom payment, curfews, arrest of critics and protesters
- Deaths: c. 1,500 killed
- Victims: People of all ages including men, women, children, babies, the unborn
- Perpetrator: Fulani extremists (led by MACBAN)
- Motive: Fulanization, Islamization, Land grabbing

The immediate origins of killings in Southern Kaduna especially in the 2010s and early 2020s can be traced to the events that brought in Goodluck Jonathan into power in 2010 as the President of Nigeria, and escalated after the presidential election in 2011, which he won.

== Background ==
It could be recounted that during the 2011 Nigerian presidential election campaign aired on the national television, the NTA, the Congress for Progressive Change (CPC) candidate, Muhammadu Buhari while addressing a crowd in another northern state of Kano in the Hausa language, called for mass violence as the crowd cheered. In his exact words as captured by TheCable,

"Ku fita ku yi zabe. Ku Kasa, ku tsare, ku raka ku tsaya. Duk wanda bai yarda ba, ku halaka shi."

The subtitles captured in the video had the following words:

"Firstly, you must register, come out and vote. You guard, protect, escort [the electoral officials] to the collation centre, and you wait until the result is counted. Anyone who stops you, kill them!"

Even though Buhari's supporters tried to give another meaning to this statement, the reality was seen after the election was lost to Jonathan.

The violence that erupted after Jonathan's victory in 2011 spread across the northern states of Nigeria with over 65,000 said to be displaced as a result. Although Kaduna State had had crises in the past, they seem to have escalated during this period in time.

In the 2011 Kaduna State gubernatorial election, Patrick Yakowa emerged as the first Christian and Southern Kaduna indigene to be elected as governor of Kaduna State. He had earlier served as governor after the sitting governor, Namadi Sambo was picked by Goodluck Jonathan to become the Vice President of Nigeria following the death of President Umaru Musa Yar'Adua in 2010. Muslim leaders in the state were not happy and threatened to resist the elevation of a Christian as governor of Kaduna State.

Yakowa's tenure did not last long as he died in 2012. His deputy, Mukhtar Ramalan Yero took over as governor of Kaduna State after he was killed in a helicopter crash in Bayelsa State alongside former National Security Adviser, Owoye Andrew Azazi. Yakowa's death was later discovered to have been plotted by an Islamic cleric, Isa Pantami (who would later 2019–2023 serve as a minister in the Buhari government), and some Northern Muslim leaders in 2010, who saw having Yakowa, a Christian, as governor of Kaduna State as "an insult to Islam in the country". The Taraba State governor, Danbaba Suntai also faced same attack but narrowly escaped.

On July 15, 2012, former FCT minister, Nasir el-Rufai, tweeted,

"Anyone, soldier or not that kills the Fulani takes a loan repayable one day no matter how long it takes."

Yero's tenure was marred with attacks by "unknown gunmen" (later discovered to be Fulani herdsmen) in the Southern Kaduna area, causing him to be unpopular among the people. This is in addition to his unpopular choice of Nuhu Bajoga as deputy governor. Southern Kaduna vowed to vote out governor Yero and president Jonathan in the 2015 gubernatorial and presidential elections, due to their insensitivity to the killings by the Fulani gunmen in the region.

In the 2015 Kaduna State gubernatorial election, Nasir el-Rufai of the APC defeated Mukhtar Ramalan Yero of the PDP.

El-Rufai picked Barnabas Bala Bantex as running mate. In spite of the rumors about the two not getting along, el-Rufai denied that their relationship was cordial. Bantex resigned in 2019 to contest for the senate of Kaduna South senatorial district under APC which he lost to the sitting senator, Danjuma Laah, of the PDP. In the 2019 Kaduna State gubernatorial election, el-Rufai selected a Muslim woman, Hadiza Balarabe from Southern Kaduna, as running mate under the APC. This would be the first time a Muslim-Muslim ticket would be experimented in Kaduna State since the return of democracy 1999. He, however, defended his choice saying the government house is neither a mosque nor a church.

== Payments to Fulani terrorists ==
In December 2016, in an open interview the Kaduna State governor, Nasir Ahmed Musa el-Rufai confessed to paying some Fulanis across the Sahel countries like Niger, Mali, Chad, Senegal and Cameroon, to stop killing Southern Kaduna indigenes due to the grievances erupting from the killing of their cattles in the 2011 post election crisis in the state. During that period, the governor said 204 people lost their lives while the Catholic Church in Kaduna State said 808 people were killed by the armed bandits.

In response to the above, the sitting senator representing Kaduna South Senatorial District, Danjuma Laah, said there was never a time in 2011 that Fulanis in those Sahel countries mentioned by the governor such as Niger, Mali, Chad and others were killed with their cattle in the Southern Kaduna as the area is not a converging point for those countries and called el-Rufai's claim a lie. According to him,

"The Governor just invented this lie to make excuse for his imported murderous Fulani kindred to continue their extermination of our people and the occupation of our lands."

Southern Kaduna was reported by the International Centre for Investigative Reporting (ICIR) to have been attacked 41 times between 2009 and May 1, 2016, with hundreds left dead and thousands of properties destroyed.

In April 2021, el-Rufai made a turn-around and said anyone caught negotiating with bandits would be severely dealt with.

== Grazing reserves in Southern Kaduna ==
The governor, el-Rufai, proposed to create cattle grazing reserves for the Fulanis in 16 separate locations in the state on 180,000 hectares of land and Southern Kaduna was to provide 130,000 hectares in six locations viewed as being strategic. The Southern Kaduna People's Union (SOKAPU) points on this plan as a cause for the immediate crises, but the Miyetti Allah Cattle Breeders Association of Nigeria (MACBAN) denied this claim.

According to the SOKAPU President, Dr. Musa Kaptain Solomon:

SOKAPU is standing on this assertion based on the genesis of the ongoing killings. As soon as the government of Nasir el-Rufai announced plans which he said was to resuscitate what he claimed were old grazing reserves in Southern Kaduna, we resisted. We already had a normal relationship in which Fulani graze cattle in our communities' lands free-of-charge and they were normal parts of our communities. They graze their cattle as usual, leave during the seasonal migration, and return when they like. We keep their belongings safely until their return. Forget about the unfortunate 2011 crisis, which was ignited by CPC thugs in Kaduna, Zaria, Zonkwa, Kafanchan and so on. That was a politically motivated issue, and had no relationship with grazing.

In June 2016, Southern Kaduna in its entirety through the SOKAPU kicked against this plan as it was viewed with suspicious motives which would allocate an additional 5,000 hectares to the Federal Government for the same grazing reserve for the Fulanis making 17 in all. The SOKAPU also claims that between 2011 and 2016, over 4,000 people lost their lives in 54 documented attacks.

The SOKAPU President, Musa, in November 2016, in an interview said, "Grazing reserve is like robbing Peter to pay Paul".

== Arrest of journalists ==
On 27 April 2016, a Kaduna-based journalist, Jacob Onjewu Dickson, a reporter for Authentic News Daily, a news website, was arrested. He reportedly wrote a report stating that the Kaduna State governor, el-Rufai, was pelted with rocks by youths on a peace-brokering mission.

On 26 October 2016, a public commentator and former Kaduna State University lecturer, John Danfulani, was arrested for his Facebook post criticizing Nasir el-Rufai's government and detained for 13 days.

In July 2017, Luka Binniyat, the SOKAPU spokesman was also arrested and detained by the Kaduna State governor, Nasir el-Rufai, for criticizing his approach to handling the attacks in Southern Kaduna. He spent over 100 days in detention and was released in October 2017.

On 8 May 2019, another journalist, Stephen Kefas, was arrested by the police in Port Harcourt, Rivers State, and later transferred to Kaduna based on "orders from above" for reposting a post on Facebook by Sahara Reporters on the kidnap and murder of the Agom Adara, Maiwada Galadima. He was remanded in the Kaduna prison. There groups held a protest for his release, with some protesters labeling the act tyrannical.

On 4 November 2021, Luka Binniyat was again arrested in his office in the SOKAPU secretariat in Kaduna, after his report of 28 October 2021, on the far-right US website, The Epoch Times, again on the Kaduna State government's way of tackling the killings in Southern Kaduna. The Committee to Protect Journalists also urged the Nigerian government to "immediately and unconditionally" release Luka Binniyat and drop all charges against him on November 15, 2021. He was released on 3 February 2022.

Other human rights abuses by el-Rufai were listed by the human rights campaigner and lawyer, Chidi Odinkalu.

== Changes to local leadership and violence against traditional rulers ==
In March 2017, the B'gwam Akurmi, HH Ishaku S. Damina, was arrested by the Kaduna State governor, Nasir el-Rufai. The reason for his arrest as narrated by the Southern Kaduna People's Union (SOKAPU) spokesman, Luka Binniyat, was that he handed over a Fulani man suspected of being a notorious kidnapper in the area to the Nigerian Army, in whose custody he died. The Akurmi youths took to the media to demand for the release of their ruler.

In October 2017, Daily Trust reported the plans to restructure 32 chiefdoms and emirates in Kaduna State, out of which 13 chiefdoms and emirates in the central and southern senatorial districts of the state would be renamed. Earlier in June of that year, 313 districts and 4,453 village heads were reportedly sacked by the el-Rufai administration with the excuse of lessening the financial burden posed by the local government councils. This reform led to the reverting to the pre-2001 77 districts and 1,429 village units at the time of the deregulation of the traditional institution by the then-governor, Ahmed Mohammed Makarfi. The affected institutions, however, challenged this decision in court.

In the early hours of January 1, 2018, the Etum Numana, HH Gambo Makama, and his pregnant wife were attacked and killed in their home in Arak village, Sanga LGA. The chief's 45-year-old son sustained injuries.

On 3 January 2018, the Agom Akulu, HH Yohanna Sidi Kukah, chief of the Akulu Chiefdom, was also kidnapped by some unknown gunmen. The chief is a younger brother of the Catholic Archbishop of Sokoto, Bishop Matthew Hassan Kukah. He was, however, released a few days later.

In June 2018, a former Chairman of the National Human Rights Commission (NHRC), Prof. Chidi Odinkalu, and the founder of the Oodua Peoples Congress (OPC), Dr. Frederick Fasehun, tackled el-Rufai, on the decision to convert some chiefdoms to emirates in the state. This resulted from the letter titled "Review of Nomenclature of chiefdoms in Kaduna State" addressed to the Chief of Kauru, written on May 30, 2018, in which the governor directed the chief, HH Alhaji Ja'afaru Abubakar, to refer to himself as an emir. The letter states,

"I am directed to inform you that you are to be respectfully addressed as the Emir of Kauru Emirate Council. Kindly accept the esteemed regards of the commissioner at all times."

The motive behind this was questioned and termed unconstitutional. The OPC leader also commended the joint resolution by the Nigerian National Assembly to sanction President Muhammadu Buhari over his attitude towards the ongoing killings in parts of that country. In October 2018, the Agom Adara, HH Dr. Raphael Maiwada Galadima, was kidnapped alongside his wife and driver at Maikyali village along the Kaduna-Kachia road on his way back to his palace in Kachia after accompanying el-Rufai to Kasuwan Magani to an attack site. The wife and driver of the chief were later released while the chief remained in the kidnappers' den. Sahara Reporters reported that the kidnappers of the chief said before he was murdered,

"Even if they pay your ransom, we will still kill you; that is the order we have."

His murder was said to be the result of his refusal of the governor's plan to balkanize the Adara Chiefdom to accommodate a Kajuru Emirate, which was created shortly after his death.

In July 2021, the Kpop Ham, HH Jonathan Gyet Maude, was also kidnapped.

Other name changes included the Atyap Chiefdom being renamed Zangon Kataf Chiefdom and its ruler, the Agwatyap, HH Sir Dominic Yahaya, demoted to a second class status. This change affected other chiefdoms as well. Some other chiefdoms were split to make way for newer chiefdoms and emirates in contradiction to the governor's excuse of cost reduction earlier given for the reduction of the numbers of districts and village wards per traditional council.

SOKAPU added that the conversion of chiefdoms to emirates have also heightened the situation.

== Demand for "Hausa-Fulani" chiefdoms ==
In August 2020, there was also a demand for chiefdoms by Fulani groups, led by the Chief Imam of Kafanchan, Kabir Kasim. He claimed most of the major towns in Southern Kaduna were founded by the "Hausa-Fulani" who he claimed are the largest single ethnic group in the area, and are often viewed as targets. He added that Southern Kaduna was founded by a Fulani tribe called the Kachechere and that other Southern Kaduna groups were migrants from northern states of Nigeria. He again said,

"We hereby debunk the claims of the Southern Kaduna People's Union (SOKAPU) of its personal interest that its members are the only indigenes of Southern Kaduna. Happily. the constitution of the country is seriously against the indigene/settler dichotomy,"

He, thereafter, demanded that a law should be enacted to stop the calling of the Hausa and the Fulani settlers in Southern Kaduna.

These demands have, however, been rejected by Southern Kaduna indigenous communities, represented by the SOKAPU President, Jonathan Asake, who in his response with Sahara Reporters, said the governor's agenda was to embark on ethnic cleansing in Southern Kaduna which has encouraged such demands by the Fulani community. He added,

"They can go and claim Kano because most of these people causing these havoc come from Kano, Sokoto, Katsina and Jigawa. They are not indigenes of Southern Kaduna. El-Rufai is giving them the latitude to cause this problem when they said they want their own chiefdom. It is not chiefdom, it is emirate they are looking for. I want to let him know that before him there were governors and after him there will be governors who will bring peace we need in Kaduna State."

== Attacks on Southern Kaduna villages ==
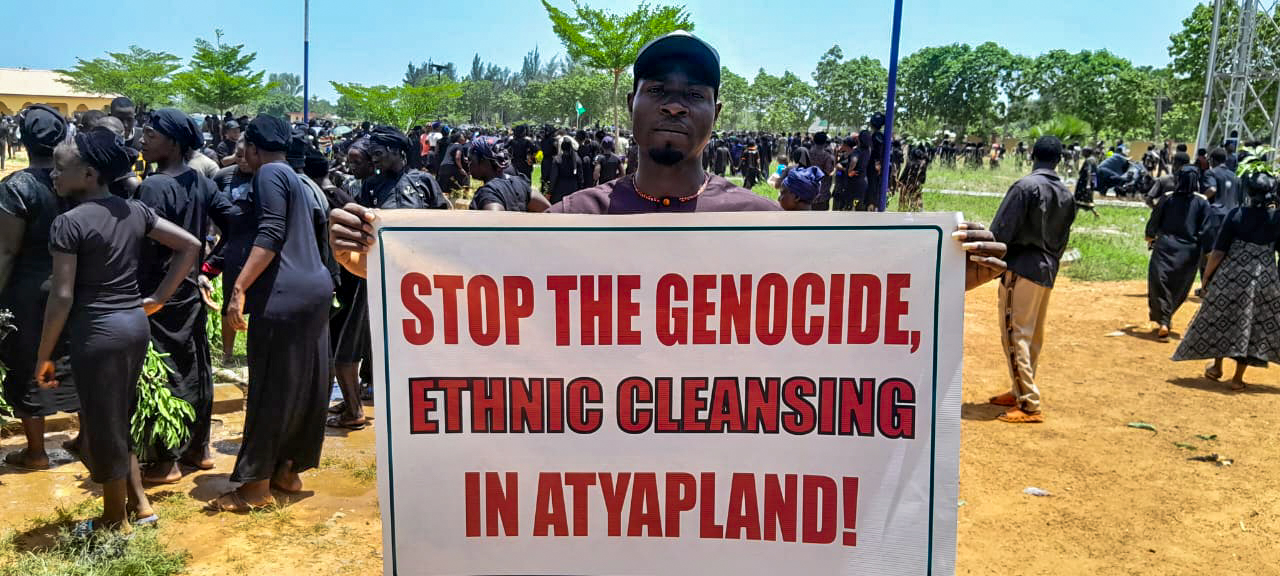
World Press Conference organized by the Atyap Community Development Association (ACDA) on May 1, 2023

On 25 August 2016, in a press statement signed by the SOKAPU President, Kaptain Solomon Musa, the SOKAPU leadership pointed out the previous confessions by the Kaduna State governor el-Rufai knowing about "genocidal killings" in Kaduna and how the governor was not doing enough to stop the killings in the region, and challenged the people of Southern Kaduna to defend themselves, calling for el-Rufai's resignation. The protest, done in collaboration with the Coalition of Professionals led by Barr. Mark Nzamah Jacob, in Gwantu, followed the continuous killings of Southern Kaduna indigenous peoples in Sanga LGA, by Fulani herdsmen. The SOKAPU leader demanded that Southern Kaduna should be included in the joint military operations undertaken by the present government of Kaduna State in the forest and bushes of Birnin Gwari to rescue rustled cows and goats to save human lives and properties. An estimated figure of 10,000 indigenes of Southern Kaduna from 24 villages were said to have been killed since the invasion of their communities started in 2011. In addition, in 2014 in Sanga alone, about 30,000 refugees fled killing and arson by the herdsmen. In Musa's words,

"...those natives are yet to return home as herdsmen have converted they farmlands into grazing grounds, under arms."

The leaders thanked the governor for visiting some of the affected communities but pressed on for more to be done after the usual political promise of ending the killings and nothing happening. They said two days after the governor's visit, the pastor of the RCCG, Ungwan Anjo, Godogodo chiefdom, Luka Ubangari, was killed by suspected herdsmen, adding that the same herdsmen went to the Ningon Community and killed two men, Gambo Sule and Benjamin Auta, two days later. They lamented that with all those acts, no one has been arrested and charged, instead youths who put their lives on the line to protect their communities are the ones getting arrested and locked up always by the police and soldiers. They recalled a statement made by Haruna Usman, the Kaduna State chairman of MACBAN, who said that the killing and destruction in Gada Biu, Akwaa, Ungwan Anjo and Godogodo were revenge for the killing of a Fulani leader (or Ardo) in the area.

On October 15-16, 2016, Fulani groups attacked Godogodo communities and SOKAPU President Musa compared the killings to the Rwandan genocide where the government failed to protect minorities from being massacred.

On Christmas Eve of 2016, 14-year-old Anna, daughter of a former Chairman of Jema'a Local Government Area and Deputy Speaker of the Kaduna State House of Assembly, Gideon Morik, and five other people were killed in their village, Goska. Morik's house and cars were also set ablaze. An eyewitness said the attackers numbered about 200 armed with AK-47 rifles chanted Allahu Akbar as they shot. This happened during a three-day curfew imposed by the Kaduna State governor, el-Rufai. According to Morik in an interview with Chika Oduah, a VOA correspondent in February 2017,

"The attackers are still outside the village. Any attempt by anybody to go one kilometer outside this village, he will be killed."

Morik died a month later, on March 16, 2017, after a brief illness.

In January 2017, the Kaduna State Council of Imams and Ulamas led by its chairman, Sheikh Abubakar Babantune, and secretary, Aminu Ibrahim, organised a press conference making accusations and calling for the arrest and prosecution of Southern Kaduna chieftains and Christian religious leaders including the senator representing Kaduna South senatorial district, Danjuma Laah; a member of the House of Representatives, Sunday Marshall Katung; clergymen like Rev. Zachariah Gado of 19 DCC Fellowship; CAN President, Samson Ayokunle; CAN Secretary-General, Musa Asake; former KASU lecturer, John Danfulani. They accused them of encouraging the killings in the region. They also called for the prosecution of Zamani Lekwot and five others sentenced to death by the Okadigbo tribunal investigating the 1992 Zangon Kataf crises. Furthermore, they asked for a review of the "White paper of the Judicial Commission of Inquiry into Kaduna State Religious Disturbances of 2001", pressing for the arrest of Elder Saídu Dogo, Archbishop P.Y. Jatau, and Archbishop B.A. Achigili; and the "White paper on the report of the Federal Government Investigation Panel on the 2011 Election Violence and Civil Disturbances", asking for the investigation of a History Teacher who slaughtered his student's father in her presence.

In June 2020, el-Rufai set up a 'White Paper Committee' to investigate the 1992 Zangon Kataf crises. According to Premium Times Nigeria's report by his special adviser on media and communications, Muyiwa Adekeye,

The events of 11th and 12th June 2020 in Zangon-Kataf and Kauru LGAs offer compelling evidence that these persistent contentions over farmlands is a conflict trigger that has to be boldly addressed, rather than wished away.

In July 2020, Fulani chieftains represented by the Miyetti Allah Cattle Breeders Association (MACBAN) said there were 3,099 Fulani IDPs in Southern Kaduna. They also reported missing persons and lost animals.

As of 30 October 2020, at least 100 Southern Kaduna villages were under Fulani occupation according to SOKAPU. There had been incessant attacks across four Southern Kaduna LGAs since Nasir el-Rufai came in as governor of Kaduna State. These include Chikun, Kajuru, Kachia and Zangon Kataf. The pattern had been that of the killing of the indigenous population and replacement with the Fulani population. Other affected LGAs include Kaura, Kauru and Jema'a. After an attack by the terrorists on the indigenous communities, curfews were usually imposed by the state government and that gives room for further killings. Some of the killings especially in the Zangon Kataf axis were alluded to the 1992 Zangon Kataf crises, like in the case of 30-year-old Yusuf, an Atyap young man, whose mutilated body was found at the bank of the Kaduna River on June 10, 2020.

Whenever youths from communities protest the act, they get arrested and detained while the killers go undetected. On 15 August 2020, a street reporter, Beevan Magoni, led a protest against the trends. Southern Kaduna youths in Kaduna, Abuja and Lagos went out peacefully to protest the killings which they termed as "genocide". Some youths got arrested in Kaduna by the police over the excuse of not informing the authorities of their plans.

In March 2019, Fr Williams Kaura Abba coordinator of the Coalition Against Kajuru Killings, released a statement accusing el-Rufai of allowing a genocide against the Christian community.

In March 2021, soldiers opened fire on women peacefully protesting the indiscriminate arrests of their children in Kanai district, Atyap Chiefdom, killing one woman on the spot, shooting two others with one dying later on, and injuring many others.

On 31 March 2021, SOKAPU reported how the Commander of the Nigerian Army Operation Safe Haven, Major General Dominic Onyemulu, got about 15 Atyap community leaders among which were village heads, arrested. He was said to have tricked them into a meeting at one of their operational base on Ungwan Rimi-Bajju road, close to Kafanchan whence they were arrested. Their offence was said to be the killing of 75 cattle (figures later adjusted to 300) and some sheep. They stayed four days in military illegal incarceration, then passed to the Kafanchan Police Area Command. Among them was Waje Laah, an unwell 85-year-old great-grandfather. They were said to have been kept by the police for six days under dehumanizing conditions before being transferred to the Kaduna State Police Command Headquarters in Kaduna. In his words, the SOKAPU spokesman, Luka Binniyat said,

"Not a single Fulani leader has been called for questioning not to talk of being detained. We also said that under Governor Nasir El-Rufai of Kaduna State, that has been the style of justice – victims are dragged and punished, while the alleged murderers are walking free with no consequence to their actions."

In February 2022, the MACBAN chairman in Kaduna, Haruna Tugga, said not less than 10 Fulani herders, including a one-year-old infant, were killed; with 99 cows either poisoned or missing between January 22 and February 2, 2022.

Adara and Atyap lands, in particular, had been under constant Fulani terror attacks between early 2020 to mid-2023. Awemi Dio Maisamari, the National President of the Adara Development Association (ADA), said between January and May 2020, no fewer than 107 people have been killed, 49 injured, about 66 persons kidnapped, 111 houses burnt, 32 villages destroyed and about 20,000 displaced. Many Atyap villages were sacked and many killed in the same unprovoked attacks, a situation which the Hausa community in the Zangon Urban district had distanced itself from in spite of allegations levelled against it by the Atyap Community Development Association (ACDA) of harbouring Fulani terrorists in the settlement.

On May 1, 2023, the Atyap Community Development Association (ACDA) organized a World Press Conference to voice out the ongoing attacks in its territory. Sun News Online reported the ACDA National President, Samuel T. Achie saying, "As of the last count, 20 villages have been displaced, 18 villages burnt down, while 518 people killed with thousands of victims who have taken refuge across many communities from 2017 till date." In less than 24 hours before leaving office on May 29, 2023, the state governor, Nasir el-Rufai proscribed the ACDA, calling it an illegal entity. In response, the National President of the ACDA said the proscription would be challenged in court because it is an infringement on freedom of association.

In April 2023, the SOKAPU National President, Awemi Dio Maisamari, advocated for a UN/AU base in Southern Kaduna. In his words,

"We advocate for a UN or AU Peace Enforcement Operations Base in Southern Kaduna. This will practicality demonstrate that the world is interested in our collective survival as minority ethnic groups. It must not abandon us to be hounded by well funded and well-armed herdsmen who are being encouraged and protected by their powerful kinsmen and collaborators in and outside Nigeria. In the past 6 years, about 63 Atyap communities have been attacked, hundreds of homes burnt and hundreds of natives killed by pillaging armed herdsmen. Not a single Fulani is facing prosecution for these crimes. Ironically, scores of Atyap leaders have been arrested and put in jail over trumped up charges in the violence in which they are the victims."...

In March 2024, SOKAPU through its spokesman, Josiah Abraks, showed delight over the decision by the Governor of Kaduna State, Uba Sani, el-Rufai's successor, to resettle the displaced communities in Southern Kaduna with the inauguration of a 10-man committee. This came after the State Security Council's recommendation issued on November 8, 2023, to resettle displaced persons in their original settlements. Responding to an interview question by a Punch Nigeria reporter, Samuel Tabara Kato, the SOKAPU National President said repentant terrorists should not be allowed to join the security agencies.

The International Centre for Investigative Justice (ICIJ) reported that between 2009 and May 1, 2016, Southern Kaduna was attacked 41 times and there were hundreds of deaths and thousands of properties destroyed.

== Unequal humanitarian treatment ==
The responsibility of fending for the Internally Displaced Persons (IDPs) affected by the attacks in Southern Kaduna, especially the indigenous populations, were heavily on the families, religious institutions and individual donors. The government and National Emergency Management Agency (NEMA) most times failed to extend the same concern to indigenous Southern Kaduna IDPs as they would to other IDPs elsewhere in the state.

== Muslim-Muslim ticket ==
In June 2023 after his tenure as governor, Nasir el-Rufai was known to have made a statement while addressing Islamic clerics on the imposition of a Muslim governor and Muslim deputy governor on Kaduna State as an experiment to be replicated in Nigeria at the Federal government level. He made the statement in Hausa and was transcribed to English, afterwards.

The National Publicity Secretary of the Middle Belt Forum (MBF), Dr. Solomon Dogo, while condemning the statement by el-Rufai said the video has revealed the much-talked about Islamization agenda on ground. He added,

"His eight years in power as governor, characterised with massive killings and decimation of Christian-dominated areas of Southern Kaduna, can now be understood."

== Impact on indigenous cultural bonding ==
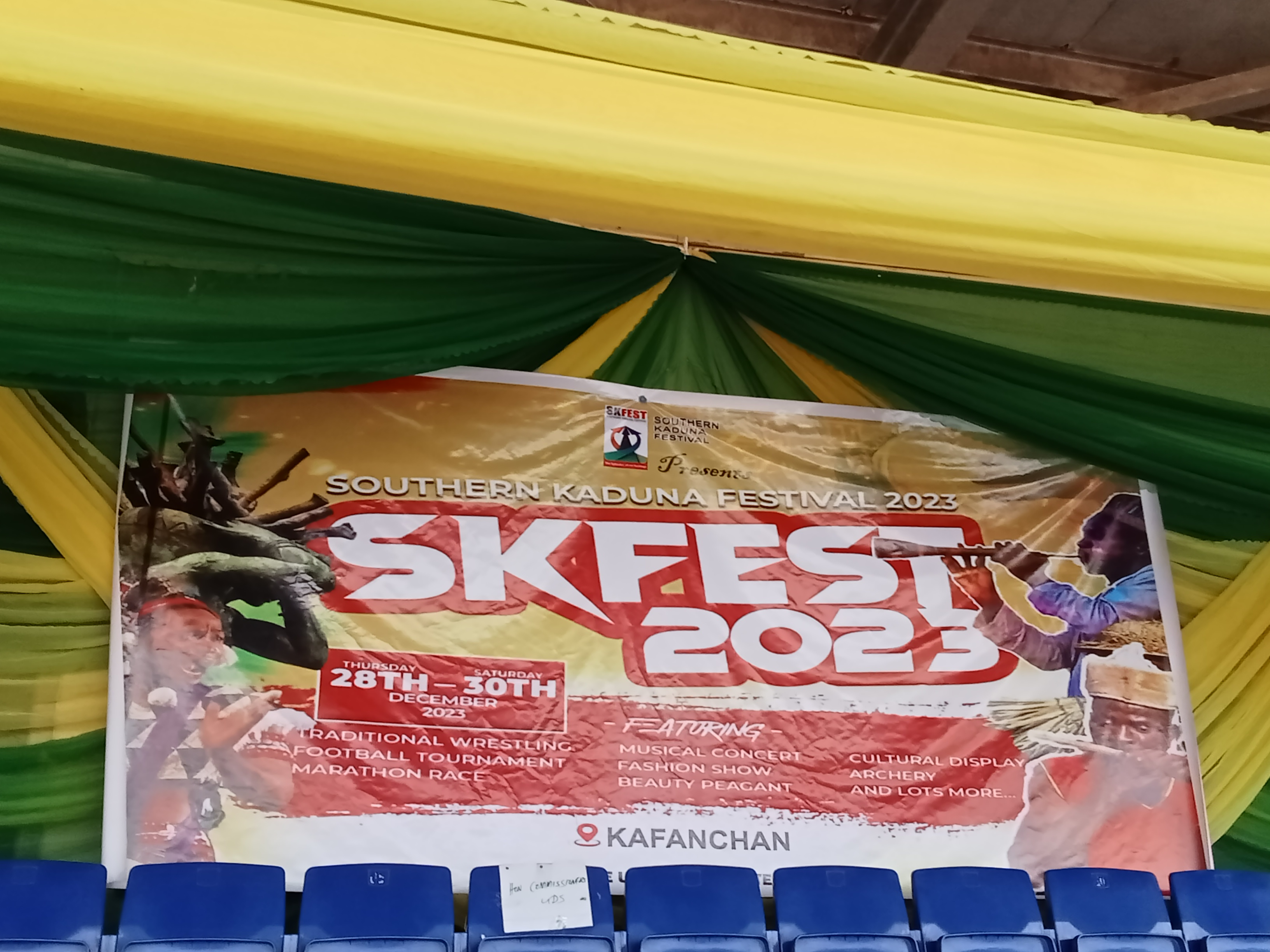
SKFest 2023 banner in the township stadium, Kafanchan

In the aspect of culture, most Southern Kaduna cultural festivals usually celebrated towards the end and beginning of the year had been halted with the lasts held between late-2019 and early-2020. These festivities only resumed with the exit of the Nasir el-Rufai regime on 29 May 2023. This exit was greeted with the introduction of the maiden Southern Kaduna Cultural Festival (SKFEST) held mainly in the township stadium, Kafanchan, between 28 and 30 December 2023. Over 20 of the about 57 ethnic nationalities in Southern Kaduna partook in the festival.

The Agwatyap's Buffet was also held in the Agwatyap's palace, Atak Njei, Zangon Kataf, on 31 December 2023. This was in honour of the Nigerian Chief of Defence Staff, Christopher Gwabin Musa, an indigene of the area, selected by the new president, Bola Tinubu, who came in few months back, to take the position. This was greeted by the people with excitement. On the same day, the Nom Bajju annual cultural festival celebration also resumed in Zonkwa after being celebrated last 18 years back, in 2005.

On 1 January 2024, the town of Gworog saw the comeback of the Afan National Festival, last celebrated in 2020.

In March 2024, the Khituk Gwong was held in Kagoma, and the Tuk-Ham in Kwain. These festivities are a way of preserving the people's cultures, building friendship and helping their languages remain.

== International reactions ==
In January 2020, the NGO Christian Solidarity International (CSI) released a warning over a possible genocide against Nigerian Christians and referenced the attacks on Christian villages in Southern Kaduna as an example of rising violence.

== See also ==
- 2022 Kajuru killings
- December 2022 Kagoro killings
- Herder–farmer conflicts in Nigeria
- June 2012 Kaduna church bombings
- Ungwan Wakili massacre
- Southern Kaduna Crisis
