= December 2022 Kagoro killings =

Killings in Kaduna State, Nigeria

- Part of Herder-farmer conflict in Nigeria, Mass killings in Southern Kaduna, and Nigerian bandit conflict
- Location: Sokwong and Mallagum 1 villages, Kagoro, Kaura LGA, Kaduna State, Nigeria
- Date: 19–25 December 2022
- Deaths: 46+: 11 killed in Sokwong village; 29 killed in Mallagum 1 village; 3+ killed in funeral attack
- Perpetrator: Fulani herdsmen (alleged by Kagoro chief)

Between 19 and 25 December 2022, several villages in Kagoro, Kaduna State, Nigeria were attacked by unknown groups, who killed over 46 people in two attacks.

== Prelude ==
Kaduna State has been a hotbed of banditry since the conflict intensified in the early 2010s. Many bandit attacks take place along the Abuja–Kaduna Highway, an extremely important trade route in central Nigeria, although attacks also occur in more remote parts of the state, often caused by conflicts or harassment of local villagers. In March 2022, alleged Fulani herdsmen launched a reprisal attack on farmers for the death of a Fulani herder, killing over 37 people and destroying a town. In response, Kaduna State governor Nasir El-Rufai visited the village and increased military presence around it, calling the protection force Operation Safe Haven. After the March attacks, there was no bandit or herder-farmer violence in the area. Prior to the December attacks, residents of Kagoro had noticed a buildup of bandit weaponry and personnel, although local military did not do anything about the situation. On 15 December, three people were killed by a bandit attack in Mallagum 1 village.

== Attack ==
The first attack began on 19 December, around 11pm. The first attack took place in Sokwong, where the bandits razed all sixty-two houses, some with people in them, and stole motorcycles and shot over ten civilians trying to flee into the bush. The perpetrators then made their way to the village of Mallagum 1where around 102 houses were burned, and over 28 people were killed.

Following the attack, the chairman of Sokwong village stated nearly every house was burnt down, and few villagers were able to gather their belongings. A statement by the Southern Kaduna People's Union (SOKAPU) stated that after the attacks, some villagers went back to search for bodies, many of which were still left in the bush after trying to flee. By 21 December, the combined death toll for both villages had reached 40. A funeral took place on 22 December.

After the funeral, gunmen returned to the village of Mallagum 1 and "started shooting sporadically", according to witnesses. The attack occurred between 9 and 10 pm on 25 December, when many Nigerian Christians were celebrating Christmas. At least three people were killed in the post-funeral attack by 23 December.

== Aftermath ==
Ufuwai Bonet, the chief of Kagoro chiefdom, stated on 1 January 2023, that he was open to dialogue with Fulani herdsmen to stop further killings. These statements were echoed by Global Peace Foundation - Nigeria's director, John Joseph Hayab, who also called for peace and negotiations. Senator Gideon Gwani, who represents Kaura LGA, where Kagoro is located, spoke out against the killings and the military's inaction in preventing them. Gwani also said most villages were still deserted by early January.

== See also ==
- Mass killings in Southern Kaduna
