= March 2022 Kagoro killings =

Mass killing in Nigeria

- Part of Southern Kaduna crisis of the Nigerian bandit conflict and Herder-farmer conflicts in Nigeria
- Location: Kanwai, Tsongai, Adan, Agban, Madamai, Kagoro Chiefdom, Kaura LGA, Kaduna State, Nigeria
- Date: 20–21 March 2022; 7:00pm, 20 March – 12:00pm, 21 March
- Target: Civilians
- Deaths: 34-40
- Injuries: ~30
- Victim: Hundreds displaced
- Perpetrator: Fulani herdsmen

Between 20–21 March 2022, Fulani gunmen attacked several villages in Kagoro Chiefdom, Kaduna State, Nigeria, killing at least 34 people and destroying over 200 homes.

== Background ==
Southern Kaduna State has been the location of a violent conflict between Fulani pastoralists and farming towns for decades, although these conflicts have taken on aspects of bandit groups active in northern Nigeria in recent years. In August 2021, the village of Malamai was attacked by the gunmen, displacing many residents. Some fled to Mallagun 1 and Sokong, both of which were attacked by gunmen that December.

The residents of the villages of Ungwan Kule, Kanwai, Tsongai, Adan, Madamai, and Agban had been informed by militants that their villages would be attacked in late March. Many residents were on high alert in anticipation of attacks, but they did not occur on 18, 19, or 20 March. Tsongai had been attacked before in February. There was a Nigerian military presence in the area, but the gunmen disregarded this.

== Killings ==
Matthias Siman, the chairman of Kaura LGA where the attacks took place, said that the militants arrived on three 18-seater buses at around 7pm on 20 March. Survivors said that Kanwai was the first village to be attacked, around 7:30pm, although they had heard sporadic gunshots around 6pm. The militants allegedly attacked the village to avenge the deaths of three cows and destruction of four motorcycles by villagers. The militants divided themselves into groups and attacked several parts of each village, causing residents to flee. Nigerian soldiers stationed in the villages as part of Operation Safe Haven fled alongside the civilians; three were reportedly killed in the attacks when fighting back. Roads to Kagoro town were blocked off by the militants, who shot at any passing civilians.

The following day, survivors said that they saw the bodies of eight people in Kanwai. They did not have much time to inspect the town when news came in of the militants returning. At that same time, Kaduna State governor Nasir El-Rufai ordered a 24 hour curfew in Kaura and Jema'a LGAs.

== Aftermath ==
In a 2023 interview, the head of Adan village, Dakaci Yashan, said that 34 people had been killed across all the attacks, and 109 houses in Adan had been torched. There were no deaths in Adan. Other residents said that they had buried at least 40 people in the attacks. 30 others were injured in the attacks. Across all villages, 200 houses and 32 shops were razed, and several vehicles and motorcycles were destroyed. Injured people went to ECWA Health Center in Kagoro town. Other displaced people fled to villages outside of Kagoro and the Kagoro town hall. The town hall served as the official IDP camp.

On 17 April, militants stormed the village of Maraban Agban, near the villages attacked in March, killing two people and injuring 15 others. In December 2022, the village of Madamai and others were attacked again, killing over 46 people.

== Imagery ==
- Destroyed houses in Kagoro chiefdom after the attack
- Injured civilians in Kagoro town after the attack
