= Runji massacre =

2023 attack on civilians in Nigeria

- Part of Southern Kaduna crisis of the Nigerian bandit conflict and Herder-farmer conflicts in Nigeria
- Location: Runji, Zangon Kataf LGA, Kaduna State, Nigeria
- Date: 15 April 2023; 10:30pm
- Target: Christian civilians
- Deaths: 33+
- Injuries: Unknown, but many
- Perpetrators: Local bandit groups Local Fulani herdsmen
- No. of participants: 200

On 15 April 2023, at least 33 people were killed in an attack by bandits on the village of Runji, Zangon Kataf LGA, Kaduna State, Nigeria. The massacre occurred just a month after the Ungwan Wakili massacre in March in the same LGA. The massacre was part of a larger campaign of attacks by bandits against civilians in Zangon Kataf.

== Background ==
Zangon Kataf LGA has been under siege by various bandit groups since late February 2023, although attacks on various communities in the LGA have occurred since 2017. On 11 March, bandits killed 17 people in Ungwan Wakili. Despite a police station and military outpost near Zangon Kataf, Nigerian authorities have done little to prevent the attacks. Three days prior to the Runji massacre, eight people were killed by bandits in a village near Runji. In the village of Atak Njei on 14 April, bandits killed seventeen civilians.

These bandit conflicts often intermingle with conflicts between sedentary farmers and nomadic Fulani herdsmen, the former of whom are Christian and the latter are Muslim. Runji is a Christian village.

== Massacre ==
The massacre occurred in the early hours between 15 and 16 April 2023. Around 200 bandits entered the village of Runji at 10:30pm on 15 April, shooting sporadically at residents and setting fire to around forty houses. Survivors of the massacre said that the bandits were local herdsmen and other armed bandits. Many of the victims of the massacre were women and children at home. At least 33 people were killed in the massacre, and many more were injured and taken to local hospitals. A mass funeral took place on 16 April.

Nigerian officials stated they would investigate the attack, with Kaduna governor Nasir El-Rufai condemning it and visiting the village on 17 April. Kaduna state officials said that Nigerian forces engaged in clashes with the perpetrators, who were still in the area.
