= Tum, Nigeria =

Tum
- Village
- Location within Nigeria
- Coordinates: 9°42′N 08°22′E
- Country: Nigeria
- State: Kaduna State
- LGA: Kaura
- Chiefdom: Kagoro (əgworok)

Government
  - əgwam Əgworok: Agwam Ufuwai Bonet (OON)
- Elevation: 896 m (2,940 ft)
- Time zone: UTC+01:00 (WAT)
- Climate: Aw

Tum is a village in Kagoro chiefdom, Kaura Local Government Area in southern Kaduna State in the Middle Belt region of Nigeria. The village uses the near by post office at Kagoro.

== People and language ==
=== People ===
The people of Tum are mainly ethnic Atyap, belonging to two subgroups, Atyap proper and Agworok.

=== Language ===
The two dialects of Tyap spoken in Tum are Tyap proper and Gworok.

== Economy activities ==
The economy activities in Tum primarily revolve around the primary sector such as agriculture, including crop cultivation, horticulture and livestock farming.

== Notable people ==
- Sen. Danjuma Laah, Entrepreneur, politician

== See also ==
- List of villages in Kaduna State
