= End Bad Governance protests =

2024 protests in Nigeria

- Days of Rage
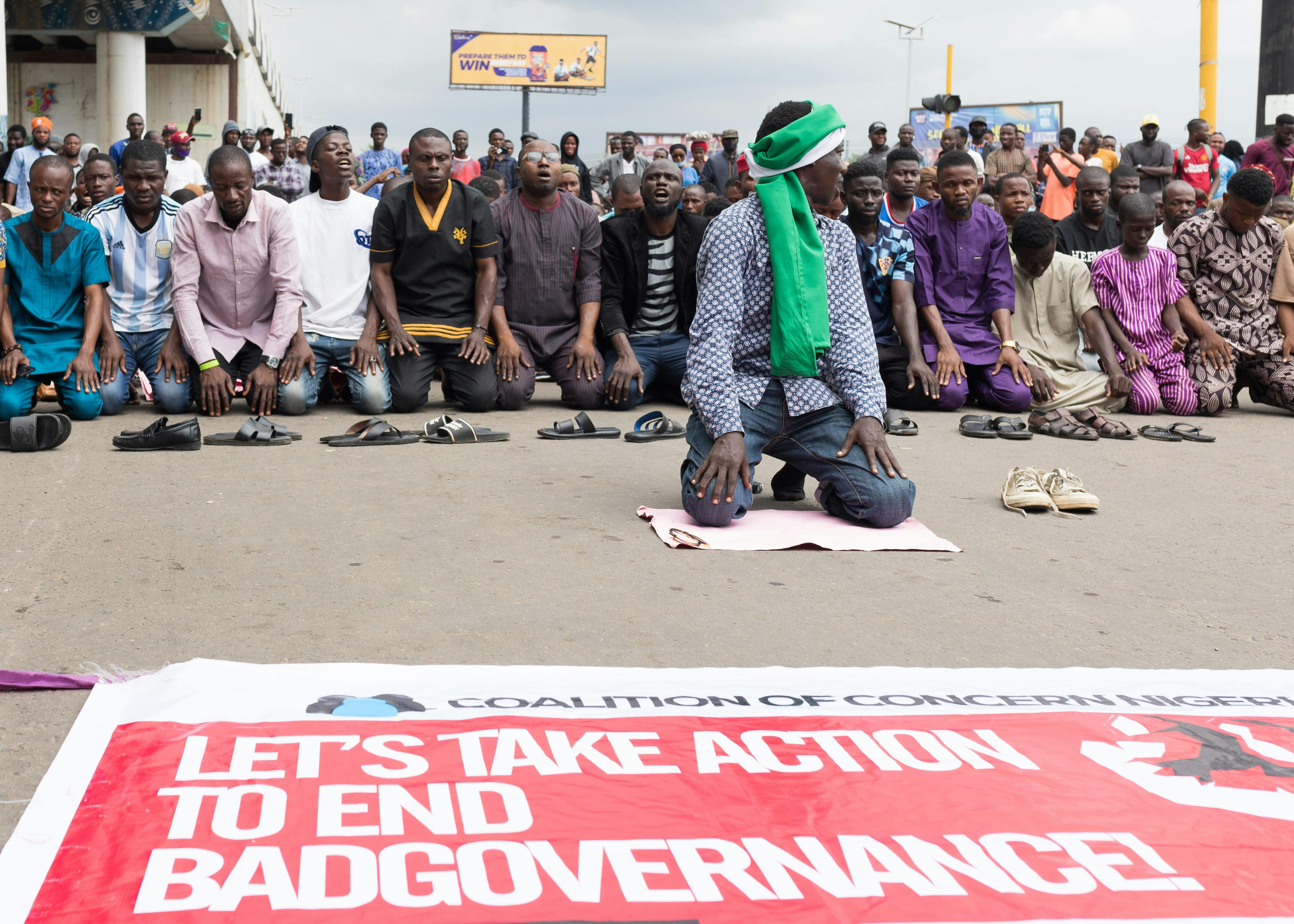
- A sit-in that took place on 2 August 2024
- Date: 1 August – 10 August 2024 (10 days)
- Location: Nigeria
- Caused by: Economic hardship and Bad Governance
- Goals: Reverse economic reforms of the Bola Tinubu administration
- Methods: Mass mobilization; street protests
- Status: Ended

Parties
Decentralized protesters (organised by various activist groups)	Government of Nigeria; Nigerian Army; Nigeria Police Force; State Security Service

Casualties
- Deaths: 22+ protesters
- Injuries: 4 protesters
- Arrested: 1 journalist 1000+ protesters

The End Bad Governance protests, widely known by the hashtags #EndBadGovernance or #EndBadGovernanceInNigeria, were a series of decentralized mass protests in Nigeria that mainly occurred from 1 August to 10 August 2024, triggered by the rising cost of living in the country.

The demonstrations escalated on 1 August 2024, when a once peaceful protest turned violent after Nigerian security agencies attempted to quell them.

== Background ==
The End Bad Governance protests stemmed from Nigeria's growing economic hardship and hunger, which BBC reporter Simi Jolaoso described as the "worst economic crisis in a generation", due to record inflation, especially on food prices. Some experts have linked the crisis to the execution of economic reforms, particularly the removal of fuel subsidies and the devaluation of the Naira following the removal of its peg to the US dollar, under president Bola Tinubu designed to liberalise the Nigerian economy and attract foreign investment. Various members of the government, including Tinubu himself, have attempted to dissuade protests, with some measures to financially support young people being announced. Protests began on 29 July 2024 as demonstrators were seen on the streets displaying placards with messages like "Enough is Enough," "Stop Anti-Masses Policies," "We Are Not Slaves In Our Country," "Hardship Is Unbearable," and "Fuel Subsidy Must Be Back." In response, the Nigerian Army on 29 July 2024 blocked major roads leading to Abuja, the capital.

== Casualties and arrests ==
On 1 August being the first day of the protests, scores were killed by the Army and Police in a bid to disperse the protesters across Nigeria. Four were shot dead in Borno State and four in Niger State. Three protesters were also reportedly killed in Kaduna State and two in Jigawa State, bringing the total number deaths to at least 14. In Kano State, four protesters were critically injured and taken to hospital. Jide Oyekunle, a photojournalist with the Daily Independent, was arrested and detained by police while reporting on the protests at Eagle Square in Abuja.

A report from the United Action Front of Civil Society stated that 21 protesters were killed and over 1,100 arrested by police on the first day of the protests. Additionally, 175 people were injured.

On 2 August, one protester was killed in Abuja by the police. The State Security Service (SSS) arrested two organizers of the protests, identified as Kabir Shehu Yandaki and Habibu Ruma, in Katsina State.

According to report by Business Day, Over 1,000 arrests have been made, and several deaths reported.

== Reactions ==
Simon Ekpa, prime minister of the Biafra Republic Government in Exile (BRGIE), reacted to the decline in South-East residents participating in the protests. He emphasized that the South-East's response demonstrates their loyalty to the Biafran Government.

Amnesty International called on the Nigerian government to urgently put measures in place to protect protesters' rights.

The United Action Front of Civil Society condemned the violent disruption of the nationwide protests by Nigerian security operatives. The CSO called on the Inspector-General of Police to prevent further violence, expressing disappointment with the police's actions despite prior assurances of peaceful conduct during the protests.

Amnesty International, the National Human Rights Commission and the Human Rights Writers Association of Nigeria (HURIWA) condemned the use of force on protesters by Nigerian security agencies.

Former vice president Atiku Abubakar condemned the killing of protesters and the physical assaults on journalists by the security operatives.

Reacting to the protests, the Conference of Nigeria Political Parties (CNPP) has called on opposition leaders to take charge and lead the protests against President Tinubu's government.

== Timeline of events ==
=== 29 July ===
Before the planned start of the demonstrations, some protestors blocked the Abuja–Kaduna Highway and marched in Niger State.

=== 1 August ===
Protests began peacefully across Nigeria in States such as Lagos, Kaduna, Kano, Gombe Jigawa, Bornu, and the capital Abuja but turned violent after the Nigeria Police Force shot tear gas and live bullets at protesters in Abuja in an attempt to disperse them. A journalist identified as Jide Onyekunle was arrested.

Police declared a 24-hour curfew in Bornu state amid protests. Protests turned violent in Kano, Jigawa and Gombe States as police used live ammunition to disperse the protesters. A curfew was also declared in Kano, Jigawa, Yobe and Katsina States.

Three protesters were killed by the police in Kaduna after protesters barricaded the Abuja-Kaduna expressway.

Federal Capital Territory Minister Nyesom Wike said the Nigerian government was ready for dialogue.

More than five protesters were arrested by the police as they tried to enforce the restriction of protesters to Eagle Square in the centre of Abuja. A police helicopter was also deployed to scare the protesters; however, the protesters defied the order. At least 25 protesters were arrested in Kaduna State after the security forces used tear gas to disperse them as they tried to break into the Kaduna State Government House.

Angry protesters burnt down the All Progressives Congress (APC) Secretariat in Jigawa State

=== 2 August ===
Protests continued in cities including in Lagos, Port Harcourt, and Benin City. Some areas like Abuja and Akwa Ibom State experienced police teargas dispersal. Curfews were imposed in several states, including Kano, Kaduna, and Borno, due to violence but were defied by the protesters.

An immigration officer in Maiduguri's Bulunkutu area accidentally shot himself in the foot three times while trying to barricade protesters.

The Nigerian military called for both local and international media to stop covering the #EndBadGovernance protests, citing that many protesters seek media attention. This appeal was made by the Chief of Defence Staff, Christopher Gwabin Musa, who emphasized that the protests should not be given coverage akin to elections. Additionally, reports indicate that telecom networks are being slowed down to hinder information flow from the protests.

One protester was killed following a clash between armed security operatives and protesters marching from MKO Abiola National Stadium to Eagle Square at the Central Business District junction in Abuja.

The SSS arrested two organizers of the protests in Katsina state.

=== 3 August ===
Protesters assembled at a major stadium in Abuja, but police deployed tear gas to disperse them when they tried to march on a main road leading into the city center. In Kano State, at least one person was shot in the neck and rushed to the hospital.

Protesters in Kano State waved Russian flags, calling for President Vladimir Putin's intervention and showing discontent with President Tinubu's administration. The Russian embassy in Abuja subsequently said that the flags were the "personal choices" of protesters and denied interfering in Nigeria's internal affairs.

Chief of Defence Staff, Christopher Musa, pledged to protect the nation from chaos.

=== 4 August ===
President Bola Tinubu addressed the protests, acknowledging the public's pain and frustration and urging protesters to suspend further action to allow for dialogue. He emphasized the need to prevent violence and destruction, and highlighted his administration's efforts to stabilize the economy and improve public welfare. Despite Tinubu's address, hundreds of protesters took to the streets in Kano State. Protesters assembled in several prominent spots such as Bakin Zuwo, Koki in the Dala Local Government Area, Sharada in Kano Municipal, and Gadon Kaya in the Gwale Local Government Area.

The governments of Kano, Kebbi, and Yobe states eased the curfew in their areas.

The Conference of Nigeria Political Parties (CNPP) urged opposition leaders to spearhead the protests against Tinubu's government.

=== 5 August ===
In Katsina, protesters, including youths and children, resumed demonstrations, waving Russian flags and chanting against the APC. The protests, which began at the residence of former president Umaru Musa Yar'Adua, saw participants marching through major streets. Police used tear gas to disperse the crowd.

Seven Polish students and faculty of the University of Warsaw were arrested in Kano State on suspicion of displaying Russian flags during protests. They were later released on 28 August.

=== 6 August ===
In northern Nigeria, over 40 people were arrested for waving the Russian flag during protests including its manufacturer.

Protests in Port Harcourt turned violent as demonstrators, primarily youths, demanded Tinubu's resignation. The protesters damaged property, including the APC Secretariat and former Governor Nyesom Wike's home.

Senator Adamu Garba Talba accused Simon Ekpa of sponsoring the protests.

=== 7 August ===
Protesters declared three days of mourning, from 7 to 9 August 2024, for those who died during the protests. The mourning period included an X Space event, a public symposium, and a candlelight procession. The decision was a response to continued violence against peaceful protesters, allegedly with police involvement. The organizers condemned government actions, demanded justice for the victims, and called for the release of detained protesters while asserting their right to protest.

=== 8 August ===
Simon Ekpa criticized Works Minister, Dave Umahi, for claiming that South-East governors were responsible for the region's non-participation in the protests. Ekpa argued that the people of the South-East chose not to join the protests due to their own decisions and resistance against certain government actions, not because of the influence of the governors.

=== 9 August ===
The Take It Back Movement, a leading organizer of the EndBadGovernance nationwide protest, scheduled a One-Million-Man demonstration across all 36 states and Abuja for 10 August.

=== 10 August ===
Protesters took to the streets in Abuja, in a demonstration dubbed the 'One-Million-Man March'.

=== 1 November ===
Unsettling video clips and pictures surfaced online showing a group of minors inside a courtroom in Abuja. In the clips, the minors looked malnourished, with a few reportedly fainting due to alleged hunger. The media reported that these minors were charged with treason and on trial following the crackdown that ensued after the protests. The Nigeria Police Force rebutted the media reports insisting those charged were adults liable to prosecution in a court of law.

== Demographics of the protest ==
The protest is considered as part of the wider Gen Z protests movement, with multiple media outlets pointing it out and linking the inspiration of the protests to the one that occurred in Kenya in the same year.

It is worth noting the results of various studies. In fact, studies have shown the extent of Gen-Z to the protests, with a study titled: "Social Media and Youths Participation in the 2024 #EndBadGovernance Protests in South-East Nigeria" noting how most of the students of the UNN, EA-FUNAI, FUTO and UNIZIK universities had participated in the protests. Another study extending to Kano state stated that 71.6% of respondents were in the age category 25‑34 years, which would put them in Gen Z and early Gen Y territory. It's worth noting the study only included people between 18-35, suggesting young adults of both generations were the main participants in Kano. These results show the prominence of young adults in the protests.

== See also ==
- End SARS
- Kenya Finance Bill protests
