= Andrew Nkom =

Nigerian writer, educationist and administrator

- Born: Andrew Andarawus Nkom; 20 June 1943 (age 83); Kaura, Northern Region, British Nigeria
- Education: • Advanced Teachers' College, Zaria, Nigeria • Boston University, Boston, United States
- Occupations: • Educationist • Administrator • Author
- Spouse: Magdalene Avan Darusa (m. 1970)
- Children: 5
- Writing career
- Notable works: Instructional Communication for Effective Teaching in University Education (2000); Promoting Quality Education in Nigeria: A Book of Readings (2017)

Andrew Andarawus Nkom (born 20 June 1943) is a Nigerian professor, educationist, administrator, and writer.

== Early life and education ==
Nkom was born on 20 June 1943, in Kaura, Northern Region, British Nigeria (now Kaura, southern Kaduna State, Nigeria). He attended SIM Primary Schools, Kaura and Kagoro, between 1951 and 1957; then proceeded to Provincial Secondary School, Zaria, 1958–1962. Afterwards, he gained admission into the Advanced Teachers' College, Zaria, 1963–1966. Between 1978 and 1980 he studied at Emerson College, Boston, United States, and at Boston University, Boston, USA, between 1981 and 1982.

== Personal life ==
Nkom married Magdalene Avan Darusa in 1970. They have three sons and two daughters.

== Working career ==
In 1963, Nkom was employed as a teacher at Takau Primary School, Kafanchan; between 1966 and 1967, he was a tutor at SIM Teachers' College, Kaltungo. From 1970 to 1978, he was a lecturer at Advanced Teachers' College, Zaria. In 1980, he became Assistant Tutor-in-Training, Ahmadu Bello University, Zaria and Senior Lecturer between 1983 and 1988 in same institution. In 1988, he was appointed Director, Kaduna State Directorate of Social Mobilisation, Kaduna. In 1980, after his studies and graduation from Boston University, he became Graduate Assistant, Media Services of the same institution; Co-ordinator, Graduate Student Centre, School of Education, Boston University, between 1980 and 1981; Consultant, Educational Resources Centre, Zaria, 1982–1985.

He was the serving Kaduna State Commissioner-in-charge of Public Affairs and Information as of the time of the state's Local government polls in February 2018.

== Membership ==
Nkom has the following memberships:

- Member, Institute of Education Inspection Team, Advanced Teachers' Colleges, Bauchi and Gombe (1980);
- Member, Kaduna State Scholarship Board (1984-1987);
- Nigerian Co-ordinator, International Contact Network Volunteer;
- Member, Centre for Adult Education and Extension Services Board, ABU, Zaria;
- Member, Board of Governors, Institute of Administration, ABU, Zaria;
- Member, Nigeria Audiovisual Association (NAVA)
- Member, National Association of Television Arts and Science, Boston Chapter, United States (1978-1981).

== Publications ==
- Media Resource Facilities for the Institute of Education, Ahmadu Bello University, Zaria: A Proposal (1979)
- A Survey and Analysis of the State of Educational Media in the Established Nigerian Universities, Ann Arbor, University Microfilms International (1982)
- ERC Planning Handbook, NESCN Publication (1984)
- Specialised Production Facilities in Nigerian University Media Services, Nigeria Educational Forum (1988)
- Instructional Communication for Effective Teaching in University Education (2000)
- Revitalizing education in the northern states: Manual on school management (2002)
- Revitalizing Education in the Northern States: Science and technology (2003)
- Promoting Quality Education in Nigeria: A Book of Readings (2017)
- Professional Teachers Handbook Technical Education (2018)
- Professional Teachers Nursing Education (2018)
