= Malagum =

Malagum Zali
- Village
- Location within Nigeria
- Coordinates: 09°40′N 08°23′E
- Country: Nigeria
- State: Kaduna State
- LGA: Kaura
- Chiefdom: Agworok (Kagoro)

Government
  - Type: Elective Monarchy
  - A̱gwam A̱gworok: Agwam Ufuwai Bonet (OFR)
- Elevation: 896 m (2,940 ft)
- Time zone: UTC+01:00 (WAT)
- Climate: Aw

Malagum (also A̱zali, Uzali, Zali) is a village in Agworok chiefdom, Kaura Local Government Area in southern Kaduna state in the Middle Belt region of Nigeria. The village uses the post office in nearby Gworok town.

== People and language ==
=== People ===
The people of Malagum surrounding areas are the Atyap proper and Agworok peoples.

=== Language ===
The people of Malagum speak two dialects of Tyap (Tyap proper and Gworok).

== See also ==
- List of villages in Kaduna State
