= Afan festival =

Nigerian annual cultural festivals

Afan National Festival Bwok A̠fan
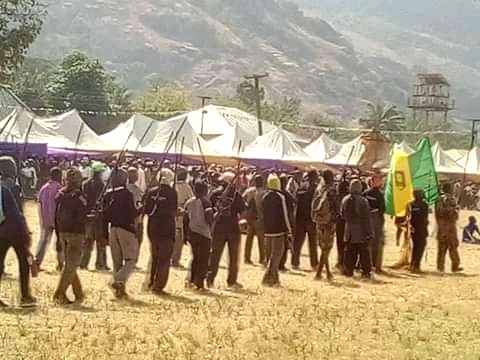
- Agworok hunters marching at the Afan National Festival, 2020 edition
- Status: Active
- Genre: Festivals
- Frequency: Annually
- Venue: Chief's Palace Square
- Locations: Ucyio, Kagoro, Kaduna State
- Coordinates: 9°36′N 8°23′E
- Country: Nigeria
- Years active: c. 1500 - Present
- Founder: A̠nkwai clan
- Previous event: January 1, 2024
- Next event: January 1, 2025
- Participants: Open to the world
- Major events: • Hunting charade • Cultural displays (dances, songs) • March pasts • Award presentation • Special prayers for the land
- Patron: Chief of Kagoro
- Organiser: Kagoro Development Association (KDA)
- People: Oegworok people

The Afan National Festival is an annual event celebrated every 1 January by the Oegworok (Kagoro) people of southern Kaduna State, Middle Belt (central) Nigeria. It is said to have been observed for over 400 years. The festival holds every January 1 in the palace of the Chief of Kagoro in the Kaura Local Government Area of Kaduna State.

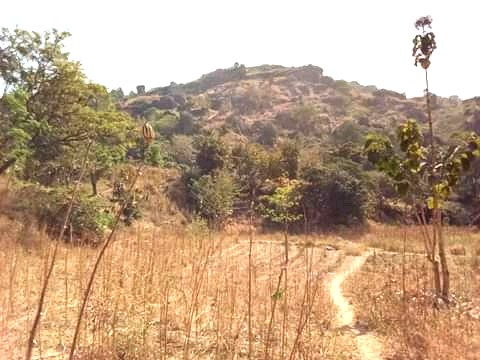
The Gworok (Kagoro) Hills

The word A̠fan means "mountain" or "hill" in Gworok. The large towering hills of Gworok are known as A̠fan A̠gworok (also styled Oefan Oegworok) among the natives. The glamorous hills are situated at an altitude circa 1,246 meters above sea level. Large trees grow on the hills with a rocky base. The weather of the area is significantly influenced by the hills and the climate is similar to that of the Jos Plateau and the Mambila Plateau, with heavy rainfall in the spring. In the early days, the Agworok people lived in the caves and atop the hill ranges for centuries before gradually settling at the foot of the mountain and finally driven down almost entirely by the British colonialist in the early 20th century although communities yet exist atop the hills. The hills provided the people security from foreign Invaders and also harbours a sacred bee colonies from when we unauthorized invasion is met with bee stings on a victim especially when such a one wears a perfume.

== History ==
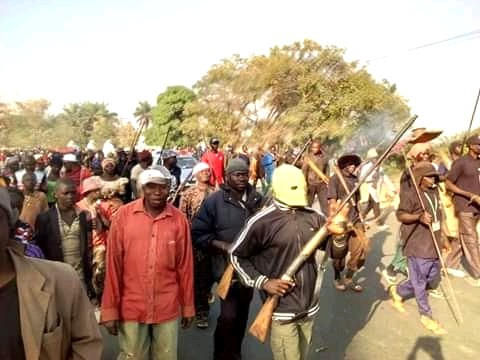
Agworok hunters marching alongside participants of the festival across the town at Agban District in the 2020 Edition.

=== Pre-modern era ===
Traditionally, the festival marks the end of crop harvest for the year and the beginning of hunting expeditions as well as other numerous activities. According to Achi in Achi et Al (2019), the Afan festival celebrated by the Agworok every second Saturday of April (now every 1 January) annually is a carry-over of the traditional hunting ceremony carried out by the Atyap, north of the Agworok. The exact date when this festival began could however not be ascertained, but it is believed to be first held when the Ankwai clan still on the Jos-Bauchi Plateau circa 1500 A.D.

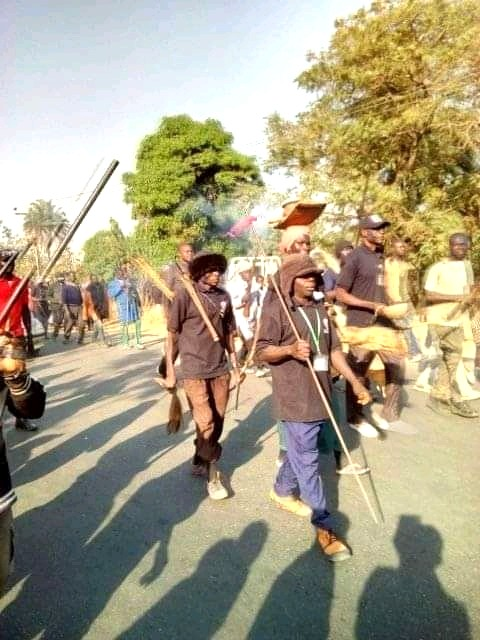
An Agworok traditional medicine woman at the Afan National Festival 2020.

=== Intermediate era ===
==== Group functions ====
The Agworok (Kagoro) people are made up of two major kwais (clans) i.e. Ankwai and Kpashang, each with its subclans. The Ankwai is the older group while the Kpashang is the newer clan consisting of migrant groups. For decisions concerning war- related matters, important festivals which involve the kick-starting of the tilling of land in the beginning of each rainy season and brewing of the first pot of beer for the Afan festival, there are subclans among the Ankwai responsible for these functions. The Kpashang clan on the other hand, takes charge of the paramount rulership of the land.

==== Rites ====
Apart from the physical protection that the hills offer the people, they are held with spiritual reverence by them also. To begin the Afan festival, the Chief Priest (A̠gwam A̠bvwoi) climbs up the hills to pray for protection from A̠gwaza or Uza, the God of heaven and earth. He afterwards shouts, "O Afan, O Afan", assisted by his colleagues and the people (who were usually warned to stay away from the hills) respond in like manner.

The Chief Priest then sanctifies the hills and very early in the morning on the next day, the hunting expeditions are begun. At the end of the expedition, returning jubilant hunters and indeed the entire village shout, "O Afan, O Afan" as the hunters approach home where beer (a̠kan) readily prepared in every home awaited each hunter.

=== Modern era ===
Much of the cultural and traditional practices of the people were however weakened with the advent of Christianity and Western Civilization which caused the dumping of the activities considered "pagan" in the Afan Festival especially with the coming of the first Christian Chief of Kagoro, HRH Agwam (Dr.) Gwamna Awan, JP in 1946 who shifted the date of the event to January 1 of every year, on New Year's Day.

In the 1982 Afan Festival event, HRH the Agwam Agworok accompanied by over a thousand people and tens of groups of dancing troops was reported to have as early as 9 a.m. rode through the town on horseback, amidst salutations from his subjects, before finally arriving at the palace at 11.45 a.m., where he gave his Afan address, expressing his people's gratitude to God for a beautiful harvest even with the "shortfall in rain supply". He afterwards took his seat amidst applause and exclamations of, "Long live Afan and the Chief". One after the other, the various dancing troops then gave their cultural displays.

== Afan Festival 2016 edition ==
Annually, this festival attracts participants and visitors from the neighborhood and different parts of the country. During the 2016 edition celebrated in a 'lowkey', the Kaduna State government promised a partnership with the Gworok community in development tourism in the area, in a bid to opening up avenues for income generation and employment creation. The event is usually held in the large field opposite the Chief's palace and the Kagoro Multi-purpose Hall, with many dignitaries usually in attendance. The 2016 event also featured the crowing of the Miss Kagoro, won by Miss Joyce Samuel Amai; Cultural dances from within and outside Kagoro; and presence of traditional, religious and political leaders, such as Agwam Nuhu Bature (Agwam Bajju), Senator Danjuma Laah, Hon Gideon Gwani and others.

== Traditional doxology ==
Gworok (Tyap):

Uza u nwuak kai nda;

A̠ ti̠n ufa ci̠p;

Á̠ shyio usa̠rag

Á̠ nat uyit, á̠ bai bi̠ nyam.

Za̠m!

Also styled: Uza u nwuak kai nda; Oe ti̠n ufa ci̠p; Oe shyio usarag Oe nat uyit, oe bai bi̠ nyam. Zoem!

Translation

"May God Almighty provide us with His peace;

Deliver us from misfortune;

Bountifully multiply us

And provide us abundantly in the New Year.

Amen!"

== Gallery ==
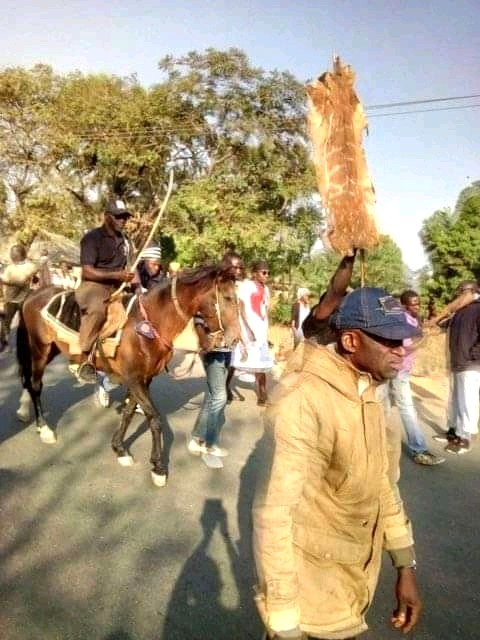
Agworok youth leader on horseback.

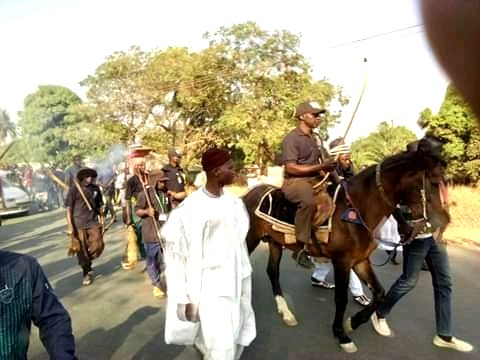
Agworok youth leader on horseback approaching.

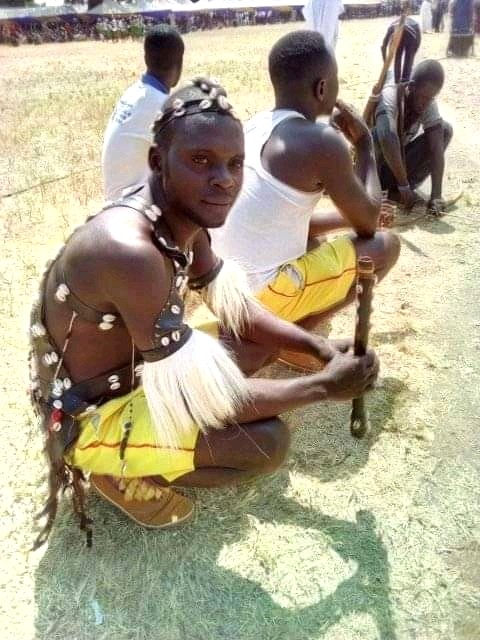
A flute blower from Watyap (Kaura).

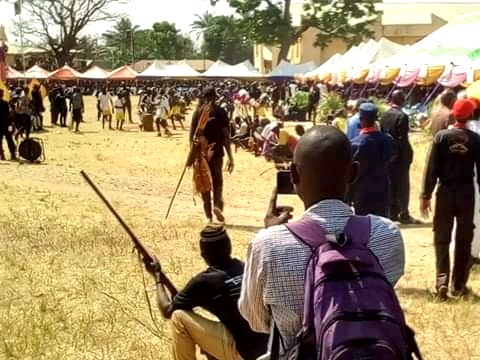
Hunters squatting during the hunting charade session.

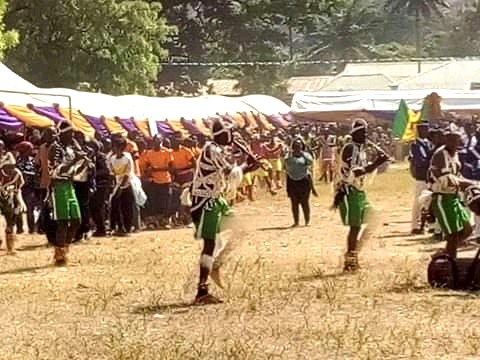
Afizere (Jarawa) dancers from Toro LGA, Bauchi State.

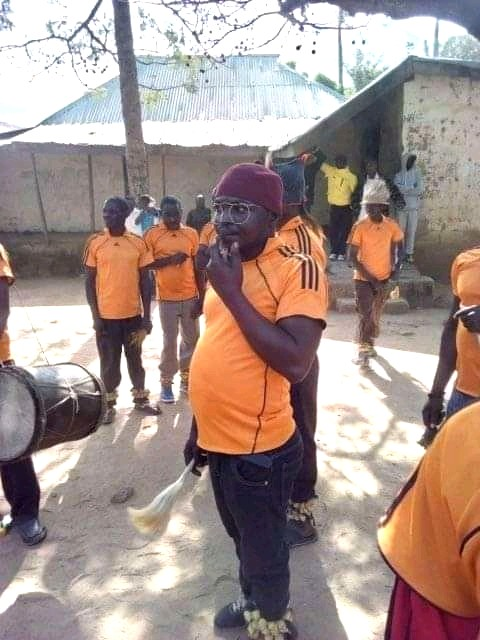
An Agworok piper by the roadside at Agban, Gworok (Kagoro).

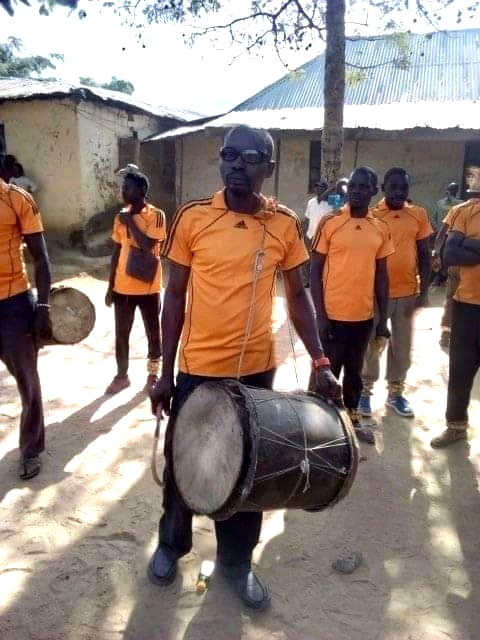
An Agworok drummer by the roadside at Agban, Gworok (Kagoro).

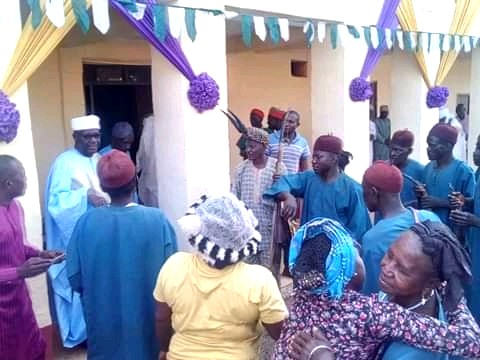
Royal horn blowers before the palace of the Chief of Kagoro.

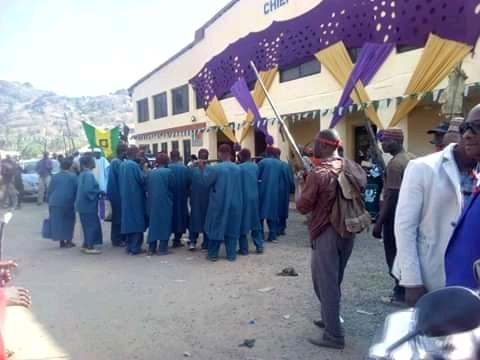
Royal horn blowers and hunters before the palace of the Chief of Kagoro.

== See also ==
- Abwoi religion
- Ayet Atyap annual cultural festival
- Festivals in Nigeria
