= Lois Auta =

Nigerian CEO

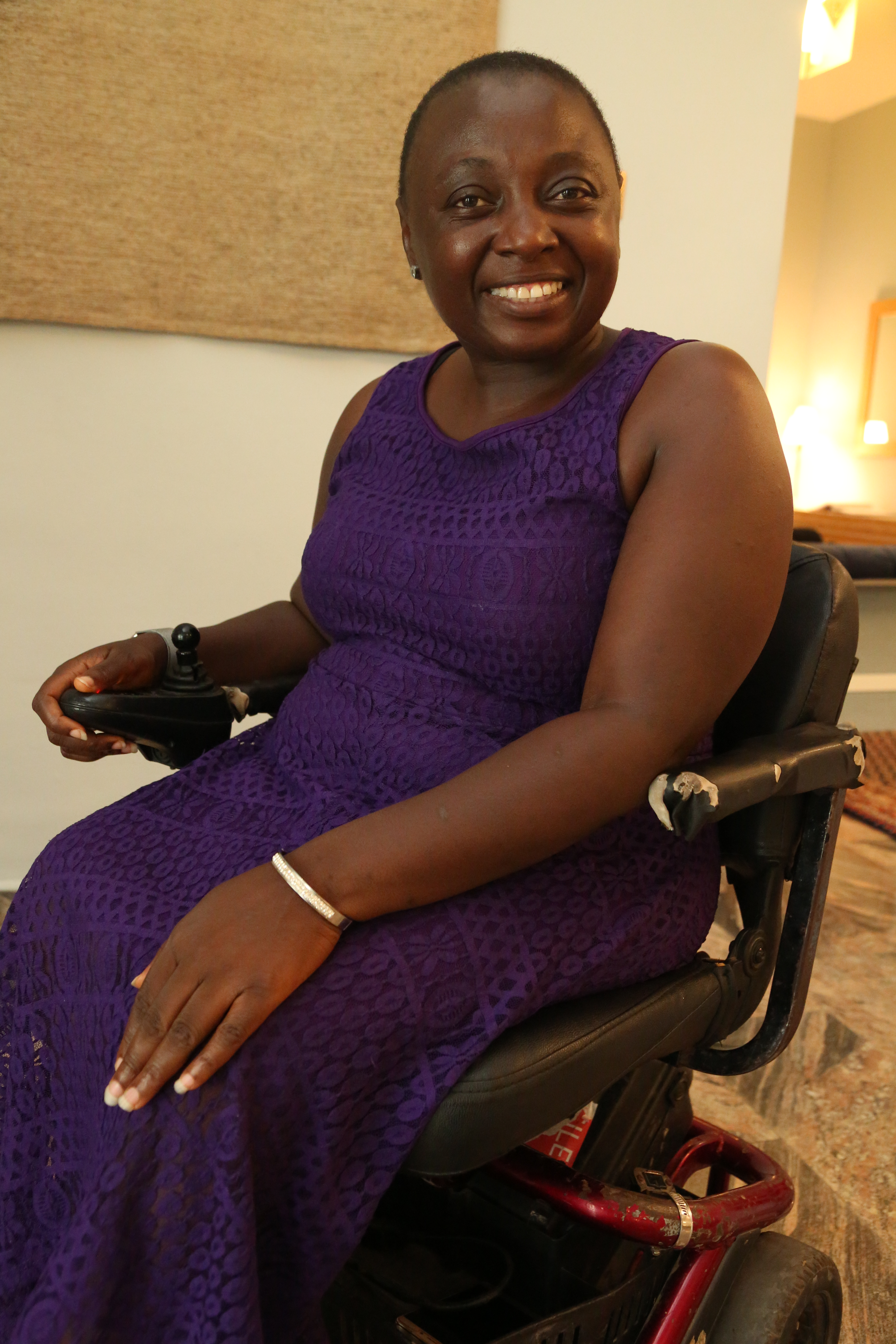
- Lois Auta
- Born: 29 April 1980 (age 46); Jos, Nigeria
- Other name: Nbwuat'ayan
- Occupation: activist
- Known for: Rights of persons living with disabilities
- Title: Chief executive officer
- Spouse: Mr Innocent
- Website: cedarseedfoundation.org

Lois Auta (born 29 April 1980) is the founder and chief executive officer at the Cedar Seed Foundation, an organization that promotes the participation of women with disabilities into human rights based development in Nigeria. She focuses on inclusive legislation for people with disabilities.

In 2019, Auta ran for the Federal Capital Territory's AMAC (Abuja Municipal Area Council)/Bwari National Assembly seat in 2022. She vied for the Kaduna State House of Assembly seat to represent the Kaura constituency under the platform of All Progressives Congress (APC) but lost at the primary to Nehemiah Sunday, facing discrimination as a physically challenged politician.

Auta was born in Jos Plateau, Plateau State, Nigeria, on 29 April 1980 into the Auta Akok family of Kukum Gida Kagoro,

She was affected by polio when she was two years old and began using a wheelchair.

She holds a diploma and a bachelor's degree in public administration from the University of Abuja, Nigeria. She studied global business administration at Nexford University, based in Washington, DC.

In 2014, she participated in the Young African Leaders Initiative and was selected as a Mandela Washington fellow

== Positions ==
- Auta is the founder and executive director of Cedar Seed Foundation.
- President of FCT Disabled Sports Club, Abuja
- Board Member of Federation of Civil Servants Staff with Disabilities Multipurpose Cooperative Society
- Assistant National Coordinator of Advocacy for Women with Disabilities Initiative
- Board Member of Potters Gallery Initiative
- Member of Joint National Association of Persons with disabilities
- Founder of Ability Africa
- President of Women on Wheels Multipurpose Cooperative Society
- Vice president of the Mandela Washington Fellowship Alumni Association, Nigeria
