= Jonathan Asake =

Nigerian politician

Personal details
- Born: 1965 (age 60–61)
- Party: Labour Party
- Profession: politician

Jonathan Asake (born 1965) is a Nigerian politician and former lawmaker. He was a candidate in the 2023 Kaduna State gubernatorial election under the Labour Party. Prior to his nomination as gubernatorial candidate, he served as the President of Southern Kaduna People's Union (SOKAPU)

In an interview granted him by Channels Television's, Sunrise Daily, he clarified that Labour Party on whose platform he runs is not a Southern Kaduna people's agenda. In his words, "The Labour Party is not a southern people's agenda, it is an expression of hope for people that felt that they have been left out, we have campaigned across the local government and indeed the teeming masses in all the local government have felt that they have been left out".

== Controversies ==
Asake was accused of mismanaging the ₦200 million donation for the Southern Kaduna IDPs by the Governor of Rivers State, Nyesom Wike in 2022. This came when he declared his intentions to run for the office of the Governor of Kaduna State. In his response, he said

"Everybody who knows me that I will not indulge in such act, so, I just laughed over it. When I am joining politics, l left over N60m in the coffers of SOKAPU."
