= Maiwada Galadima =

Agom Dr. Maiwada Galadima (JP)

Chief of Adara Chiefdom
- In office: 2007 – 2018
- Predecessor: Agom Adara II
- Successor: Seat vacant
- Born: 11 November 1954; Ikuzeh, Northern Region, British Nigeria (now Ikuzeh, Rimau District, southern Kaduna State, Nigeria)
- Died: 26 October 2018 (aged 63)
- Burial: Kachia, Nigeria
Names
- English: Maiwada Raphael Galadima

His Highness Maiwada Raphael Galadima (November 11, 1954 - October 26, 2018) was the paramount ruler of Adara Chiefdom, a Nigerian traditional state in southern Kaduna State, Nigeria. He was known by the title Agom Adara III.

== Early life ==
Galadima was born on November 11, 1954, at Ikuzeh, Rimau, Northern Region, British Nigeria (now Ikuzeh, Kufana District Kajuru Local Government Area of southernKaduna State, Nigeria. As a child, he was groomed a Catechist, which was his childhood ambition. He came from a Catholic background.

== Career ==
Before ascending the throne as the Agom (monarch) of the Adara people, Galadima worked as a textile operator, a clerical typist and a classroom teacher. He was one time an administrative officer and later became a unit head of the Department of Welfare and training of the Kaduna Local Government Service Commission before retiring to take up an appointment as the District Head of Rimau. As Agom Adara, he became "the Commander of the National Association of the Nigerian students".

== Kingship and death ==
Galadima became the monarch of the Adara nation on April 1, 2007, as Agom Adara III or the third indigenous ruler of the Adara Chiefdom, Adara Traditional Council, and remained so until his kidnap and murder in October, 2018.

He was enthroned as a second class chief. However, in May, 2010 his Chiefdom was upgraded to a first class status, himself automatically assumed the status of a first class chief, probably due to the recognition of his positive relentlessly efforts in bringing relative peace in his chiefdom.

His death was perceived as a state-organized affair as reported by various news media. Sahara Reporters gathered that the Royal Father died as a result of resistance of the attempts by the Kaduna State Governor, Nasir el-Rufai, to restructure Kajuru (a Local Government Area in the state) which happened to be a part of the Adara Traditional Council's area of jurisdiction into an emirate, with another report that the kidnappers remarked thus:

"Even if they pay your ransom, we will still kill you: that is the order we have..."

The Guardian reported that the kidnappers dumped his corpse at Kateri, located in nearby Chikun Local Government Area on October 26, 2018, after holding him ransom for about a week, kidnapped on his way from a meeting with the state governor in Kaduna. It also reported the national president of the Adara Development Associated (ADA) suing for "a peaceful, solemn and digified funeral befitting the nature and person of the late Agom", who was buried on November 10, 2018, at Kachia. His seat had since been left unoccupied.
