= Chris Delvan Gwamna =

Nigerian gospel singer, songwriter and pastor

- Born: Christopher Delvan Gwamna Ajiyat; 12 December 1960 (age 65); Kagoro, Kaduna State, Nigeria
- Genres: Gospel; CCM; worship
- Occupations: Gospel singer, songwriter, pastor
- Instruments: Vocals; guitar
- Label: House of Jeduthun Music Inc.

Christopher Delvan Gwamna Ajiyat (born 12 December 1960) is a Nigerian gospel singer, songwriter and presiding pastor of The King of All Kings Church of the Capstone, formally New Life Pastoral Centre (New Life Assembly), based in Kaduna, Nigeria and also oversees the ministerial arms such as: Arewa Christian Initiative; House of Jeduthun; Metahost Partnerships and Pisgah Media.

== Life and education ==
Gwamna was born in Kagoro, Kaduna State, Nigeria on 12 December 1960. He graduated from Ahmadu Bello University in the 1980s with a bachelor's degree in history and political science. Gwamna and his wife, Anna (also a pastor), gave birth to two children, Joel and Salamatu. He is also the Spiritual Father to many new singers and songwriters like Victoria Orenze

== Musical and clerical career ==
Gwamna has travelled many parts of the world since the beginning of his musical career and has been featured in programmes such the inter-denominational carnival of praise and Worship that was held in Tafawa Balewa Square, Lagos, organized by Omegabank Plc. on 12 May 2001.

He was one of the officiating ministers at the Men of Issachar Vision's conference, led by the former Nigerian Vice President, Yemi Osinbajo, in Ibadan in January 2017, as reported by The Cable.

In 2018, he was listed by YNaija as one of the 100 Most Influential People in Christian Ministry in Nigeria.

== Achievements and awards ==
Gwamna participated in the translation of the Revised Standard Version into Hausa language, for the Bible League of the United States of America and successfully completed the project in 2003.

Gwamna received Fellow's Investiture and Icon of Mentorship Award on 26 April 2017 from Institute of Mentoring and Career Coaching Nigeria (IMCCN) in recognition of "his spiritual leadership, mentorship and sacrifice to humanity" at Koinonia Cultural Development Centre of the New Life Pastoral Centre in Kaduna, presented to him by the director-general of the institute, Rotimi Matthew.

== Discography ==
- "I Lead the Earth"
- "Little Foxes"
- "You’re My Guiding Light"
- "El-Elohe Israel"
- "He's the Lamb, He's the Lion"
- "You are Glorious"
- "I Will Follow"
- "I Will Sing"
- "Out of the Ashes"
- "Take Me Deeper"
- "The Lord is my Light"
- "Until Shiloh"
- "You are the Holy Ghost"
- "Bringing Everything In Obedience to Christ"

== Videography ==
- "Holy Holy Holy Latest" (Nigeria Gospel Song)
- "Glorious Life Songs"
- "Narration"
- "I Will Sing"
- "Word & Worship Conference 2018"

== Popular quotes ==
"Out of the ashes of my dying today; I see the breaking of a brand new day…"

— Chris Delvan Gwamna

"I take prime interest in people, because I have failed many times but I made it a life goal of making sure people coming up do not fail. I do all I do casually but seriously with most influence and the award is a call to come up higher and be the salt and light of the world."

— Chris Delvan Gwamna ^{(At IMCCN award programme)}
