= Southern Kaduna People's Union =

Socio-cultural organization in Nigeria

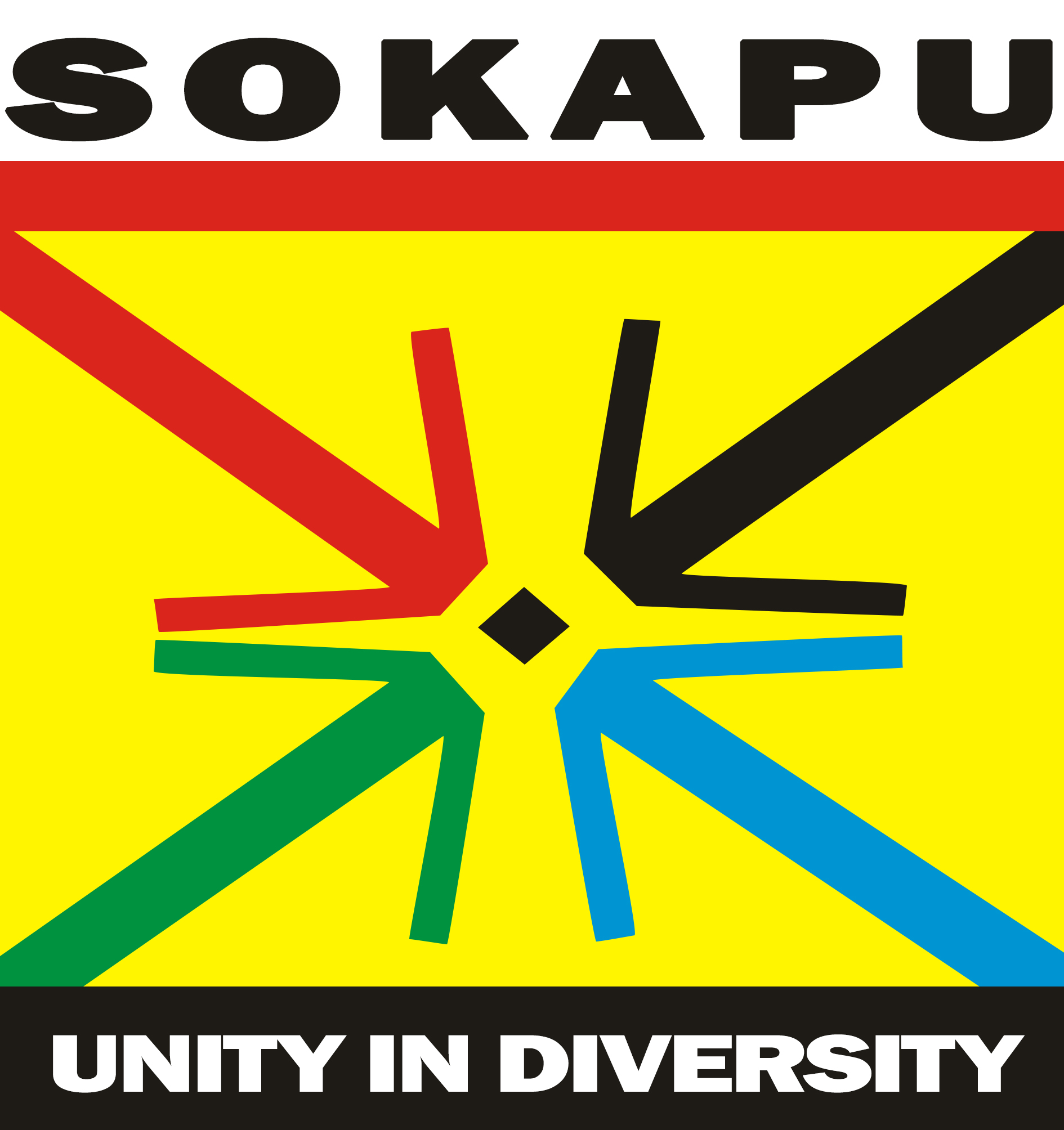
- SOKAPU logo
- Abbreviation: SOKAPU
- Purpose: activism (mouthpiece of the people of Southern Kaduna)
- Location: Kaduna, Nigeria
- Origins: Nerzit Movement
- Region served: 12 LGAs of Kaduna State
- Official language: English
- President: Samuel Tabara Kato
- Main organ: National Executive Committee (NEC)

Southern Kaduna People's Union (SOKAPU) is a socio-cultural organization, acting as an umbrella body representing the people of Southern Kaduna, Kaduna State, Nigeria. In a statement made by the chairman of Southern Kaduna Leadership Council (SKLC), Ishaya Dary Akau, in September 2022, SOKAPU was mentioned as a member of the council. However, many are uncomfortable with the SOKAPU being berated as a member of the SKLC. As of March 2024, the SOKAPU National President was Samuel Tabara Kato.

== History ==
The Southern Kaduna People's Union (SOKAPU) was said to be an offspring of a defunct body called "Nerzit" (meaning "Our people"). The name was coined from how many Southern Kaduna ethnic groups refer to themselves and their neighbours.

== Socio-political engagements ==
In July 2000, SOKAPU asserted that Kaduna was founded by the Gbagyi, which the Muslim League for Accountability (MULAC) leader, Muhammad Awwal Sa'id, faulted in a press conference at the Press Centre in Kaduna. He accused SOKAPU of distorting what he called 'historical facts'.

On 8 April 2014, associations in Southern Kaduna including the Ephraim Goje-led SOKAPU, signed a pact with the MACBAN to bring to an end the killings ongoing in parts of Southern Kaduna by the Fulani herdsmen.

On 25 August 2016, the SOKAPU excos issued a press statement during a mass protest staged by the union in Gwantu, Sanga LGA, which was signed by its president, Kaptain Solomon Musa, carefully pointed out the previous confessions by the Kaduna State governor, Nasir el-Rufai, including biased comments and confessions of knowing who the killers of the Southern Kaduna people were and doing nothing to stop the killings in the region. The union challenged the people of Southern Kaduna to defend themselves. They also called for el-Rufai's resignation due to his biased attitude toward the killings.

In April 2017, SOKAPU released a communique signed by its president, Kaptain Solomon Musa, and General Secretary, Anto Ambi Ogah, warning of an impending humanitarian crisis across Southern Kaduna due to the ongoing killings in the region. The statement was made after the SOKAPU stakeholders' summit at the Bajju Town Hall, Zonkwa.

In November 2020, Jonathan Asake, the SOKAPU President expressed his views on the peace-brokering by the Agwatyap between the Atyap and Fulani as a "cosmetic process". He said peace cannot be achieved without justice and said SOKAPU is open to partnering with the Nasir el-Rufai-led government and other sociocultural groups in pursuit of peace so long as there is justice. In his words,

"But we believe peace is not achieved through a cosmetic process. There must be justice first. People attacked without provocation at night by Fulani invaders and the governor (Nasir El-Rufai) keeps denying and saying it is communal clashes."

Twice, the SOKAPU spokesman, Luka Binniyat, was arrested for criticizing Governor El-Rufai's approach to handling the attacks in Southern Kaduna, firstly in July 2017 and secondly in his office at the SOKAPU secretariat in Kaduna in November 2021.

In April 2022, Asake issued a statement saying that 148 communities were attacked by bandits and terrorists, with about 200,000 natives displaced in the past six years in Southern Kaduna. He, thereafter, called on Civil Society Organisations (CSOs), Non-Governmental Organisations (NGOs), Foreign Missions, the EU, UN, and others, to look into the ongoing atrocities, crimes against humanity, and ethnic cleansing being done against Southern Kaduna people. He added,

"Mineral deposits and green areas for cattle rearing in the entire Middle Belt are responsible for killing in Southern Kaduna. We have concluded plans to take over our ancestral land because what is going on is ethnic cleansing in Southern Kaduna and the entire Middle Belt. Several communities have been attacked in Southern Kaduna at genocidal proportion."

Later in 2022, Asake's successor, the now acting national president of SOKAPU, Awemi Dio Maisamari, as reported by Leadership Nigeria responded to the alarm raised by the Kaduna State governor, Nasir el-Rufai, over a memo he wrote to the Nigerian president, Mohammadu Buhari, about the rising security challenges in the state with concerns of terrorists creating a parallel government. Maisamari reportedly said the governor ought to refocus his robust and occasionally misguided political determination toward prioritizing the security and well-being of the people of Kaduna State, to address the escalating insecurity. The SOKAPU leader was also said to have added in a statement issued afterward, that the governor's admission served as validation for the concerns and alarms being voiced by the union since 2019. SOKAPU said that apart from the atrocities committed during attacks, there are ongoing unspeakable crimes and barbaric acts taking place in occupied communities, which are difficult to comprehend fully but are happening daily.

In February 2023, both the SOKAPU and SKLC endorsed Peter Obi of the Labour Party (LP) and Atiku Abubakar of the PDP, two candidates running for the position of President of Nigeria.

In April 2023, the SOKAPU National President, Awemi Maisamari Dio, called for a UN/AU base to be established in Southern Kaduna following the intensified killings in Atyap land. In his words,

"We advocate for a UN or AU Peace Enforcement Operations Base in Southern Kaduna. This will practically demonstrate that the world is interested in our collective survival as minority ethnic groups. It must not abandon us to be hounded by well-funded and well-armed herdsmen who are being encouraged and protected by their powerful kinsmen and collaborators in and outside Nigeria. In the past 6 years, about 63 Atyap communities have been attacked, hundreds of homes burnt and hundreds of natives killed by pillaging armed herdsmen. Not a single Fulani is facing prosecution for these crimes. Ironically, scores of Atyap leaders have been arrested and put in jail over trumped up charges in the violence in which they are the victims."...

== Leadership ==
In November 2019, former lawmaker and adviser to former Nigerian president Olusegun Obasanjo, Jonathan Asake, defeated closest contender polled 248 votes defeating closest contender, Reuben Turbi, polled 49 votes.

Sometime in early 2022, the Director-general of SOKAPU, Ishaku Kazah Bitrus, reportedly said its national leader, Jonathan Asake, was not an aspirant of any political party in the forthcoming 2023 Kaduna State gubernatorial election.

In August 2022, the SOKAPU National President, Jonathan Asake, resigned to contest for the position of Governor of Kaduna State under the Labour Party in the 2023 Kaduna State gubernatorial election, which he later lost to Uba Sani of the APC. In his stead, Awemi Dio Maisamari, the national president of the Adara Development Association (ADA), was made to take his place on 10 September 2022, at the second National Executive Council (NEC) meeting of SOKAPU in Kaduna. Elder Stephen Bangoji, the SOKAPU Board of Trustees (BoT) chairman, and some board members were in attendance.

In April 2023, a Punch Nigeria reporter criticized the SOKAPU leader for making a statement he felt wasn't right. The reporter narrated that the SOKAPU leader was on AIT and talked about not believing in the current government and the entire system.

In December 2023, Samuel Tabara Kato emerged as the winner of the election for the SOKAPU National President chair by polling 342 votes. He defeated former Atyap Community Development Association (ACDA) President, Samuel Achie, polled 299 votes.

=== Structure ===
SOKAPU has a National Executive Council (NEC), constituting the Central Executive Committee (CEC), chairman and Secretaries of all State Chapters and local branches. It also has the Women, Youth and Student wings, and all past Presidents of SOKAPU.

=== List of National Presidents of SOKAPU ===
- Ephraim Goje (20??-2016)
- Kaptain Solomon Musa (2016–2019)
- Jonathan Asake (2019–2022)
- Awemi Dio Maisamari (2022–2023)
- Samuel Tabara Kato (2023-date)

=== Internal crises ===
On 13 May 2023, the entire SOKAPU national exco was suspended by the NEC in a meeting in Kaduna. The suspended exco, however, challenged the decision. They tendered a letter of protest titled "Request For Urgent Intervention On The Purported Suspension of the CEC By NEC" to Stephen Bangoji, the chairman, of the Board of Trustees (BoT) of SOKAPU, stating that their suspension was not carried out by proper procedures, and as a result, they sought the BoT's intervention. The opening paragraph of the letter had the following content,

"The Central Executive Committee (CEC) has been embroiled in a leadership crisis which has pitched the President of SOKAPU, Mr. Awemi Dio Maisamari, the General Secretary, Mr Stephen Mallan on one side and 13 other members of the exco respectively."

Among the concerns of the suspended SOKAPU national excos is the bringing of SOKAPU under the group called the Southern Kaduna Leadership Council (SKLC) among others, all stated in the letter.

"Some of the areas in which we have had major disagreements with the two are: "Subsuming SOKAPU under one Southern Kaduna Leadership Council (SKLC), which is an aberration of the norm. SOKAPU cannot be under any southern Kaduna group, without amending the constitution of our great union. The President is more loyal to the Community Development Associations’ (CDA) forum and one CONA[E]CDA in which he has remained the President of Adara Development Association (ADA) and the Vice President of CONAECDA.""...

In the letter, the excos accused Maisamari of inactivity and Mallan of incompetence. They said the SOKAPU President convened a CEC meeting on 25 April 2023, in which there were disagreements on several issues, and then he announced that another meeting with the NEC would be held on 13 May 2023, to address the issues that could not be trashed during the CEC meeting. During the meeting with the NEC, the acting national president of SOKAPU, Awemi Dio Maisamari, made a remark expressing his failure to lead SOKAPU and thereafter tendered his resignation. The NEC after suspending the excos created an Investigation Committee and a Caretaker Committee to manage the union. In a signed statement, the NEC's Vice President 1, Elisha Rosy, and 11 others expressed concerns over the sudden transformation from a once vibrant union representing the 67 ethnic groups of the 12 LGAs of Southern Kaduna to a voiceless one.

=== Youth wing ===
In February 2024, the current leadership of the youth wing of SOKAPU was elected. About 345 delegates were present from across the country. Maikano Mendwas emerged as the national coordinator with 203 votes, defeating Solomon Simon who polled 47 votes; Jeremiah Ishaya the deputy coordinator and Nathaniel Auta the secretary.

== Demands ==
In May 2021, Jonathan Asake, the SOKAPU National President, demanded the creation of a separate state for Southern Kaduna to solve the problems being faced by the people of the region which according to him, included marginalisation and the issue of killings. He remarked,

"We have been demanding for a state of our own for over thirty years and Gurara State was among the 18 states proposed in the 2014 Confab report. We are demanding the creation of the Gurara State after the amendment. This will help in solving the incessant conflicts between our people and the other divide..."

== People-oriented projects ==
The SOKAPU leadership was challenged in an interview with Blueprint Nigeria by Simon Abaah Jatau, a former interim chairman of Jema'a LGA, to implement modern agricultural practices and dry season farming to increase the income of farmers in the region. He urged affluent individuals to support the less privileged, cautioning the youth against engaging in negative behaviors, and called for collective efforts, including sacrifices from SOKAPU leadership, to achieve the union's goals and advance the area's development.

== See also ==
- Mass killings in Southern Kaduna
