= 2022 Kajuru killings =

Mass killings in Kaduna State, Nigeria

- Part of Nigerian bandit conflict
- Location: Ugwan Gamu, Dogon Noma, Ungwan Sarki, and Maikori, Kajuru, Kaduna State, Nigeria
- Date: 5 June 2022; Noon-6pm
- Deaths: 33+
- Perpetrator: Fulani militiamen (alleged by locals)

On 5 June 2022, alleged Fulani militants killed thirty-two civilians in four villages in the Kajuru area of Kaduna State, Nigeria.

== Prelude ==
In the villages where the attack took place, attacks by Fulani militiamen were not a new occurrence. Prior to the attack, bandits abducted 14 people from a train station at the town of Idon, also in the Kajuru area.

== Attack ==
According to locals, the militants attacked four villages in the Kajuru area - Ugwan Gamu, Dogon Noma, Ungwan Sarki, and Maikori. The attack began around noon on 5 June, where around 450 militants stormed Dogon Noma and Ungwan Gamu on 150 motorcycles, burning down houses and gathering people out of their homes. Some residents in Maikori began to fight back against the militants when they heard the news, which initially worked, although a "white-painted helicopter", which the civilians believed was coming to their aid, began to gun down the villagers fighting back. The helicopter however, did not gun down fleeing residents. After killing around 32 residents in Dogon Noma and Ungwan Sarki, the bandits made their way to Maikori, where the population fled as the bandits burned down houses and killed one person. The village of Maikori was burned to the ground, and Ungwan Sarki was partially destroyed. The bandits began to disperse around 6pm.

== Aftermath ==
The Kajuru attack occurred on the same day as a massacre at a church in Owo, Nigeria. Leaders in the Adara community, where the villages are located, corroborated claims of the helicopter attack, although this was denied by the Nigerian government.

In the following days, the death toll rose from 25 to 32 killed in Dogon Noma, as bodies were being discovered in the forests nearby. Many of the people killed were men, with 16 men, 5 women, and 4 children being counted.
