= Ungwan Wakili massacre =

Terrorist incident in Nigeria

- Part of Herder-farmer conflicts in Nigeria, Mass killings in Southern Kaduna and the Nigerian bandit conflict
- Location: Ungwan Wakili, Zangon Kataf LGA, Kaduna State, Nigeria
- Date: 11 March 2023; 7pm
- Deaths: 17+
- Perpetrator: Unknown bandits

On 11 March 2023, armed bandits attacked the village of (Tyap: Mawukili) Ungwan Wakili in Zangon Kataf LGA, Kaduna State, Nigeria, killing seventeen people.

== Background ==
The Zangon Kataf LGA in northern Nigeria's Kaduna State had been under siege by bandit groups since the end of the 2023 Nigerian presidential election, with Nigerian forces stationing troops in the town of Zangon Kataf and on its outskirts. Many of these bandits were local herders and farmers in the LGA, and communal violence between the two groups had been ongoing since 2017.

== Massacre ==
The attack started due to a scuffle between security forces and a Fulani man at a checkpoint in Ungwan Wakili, leading to a police officer being shot. The argument started over a series of complaints by locals about cow poisonings and destruction of produce from herders and locals. At about 7pm on 11 March, a group of Fulani herders on motorcycles attacked Zangon Kataf, first attacking a group of young boys fishing at a lake.

Seventeen people were killed in the attack on Ungwan Wakili, and Nigerian security forces stationed nearby intervened shortly after the massacre. Nigerian police enacted a 24-hour curfew in Ungwan Wakili, Ungwan Juju, Mabuhu, and the town of Zangon Kataf following the massacre, and the commander of the Kaduna State Police stated that cleanup operations began in the forest around Ungwan Wakili the day after the attack. When Nigerian forces intervened, the commander stated many of the perpetrators fled.

== Aftermath ==
A second massacre occurred in Zangon Kataf LGA on 15 April when herder militias attacked the town of Runji, killing over 33 people. The head of the Atyap Community Development Association condemned the attacks and stated these massacres were harder to prevent because Nigerian forces were always late to the scene.
