= Kaura, Nigeria =

Kaura Watyap
- LGA and town
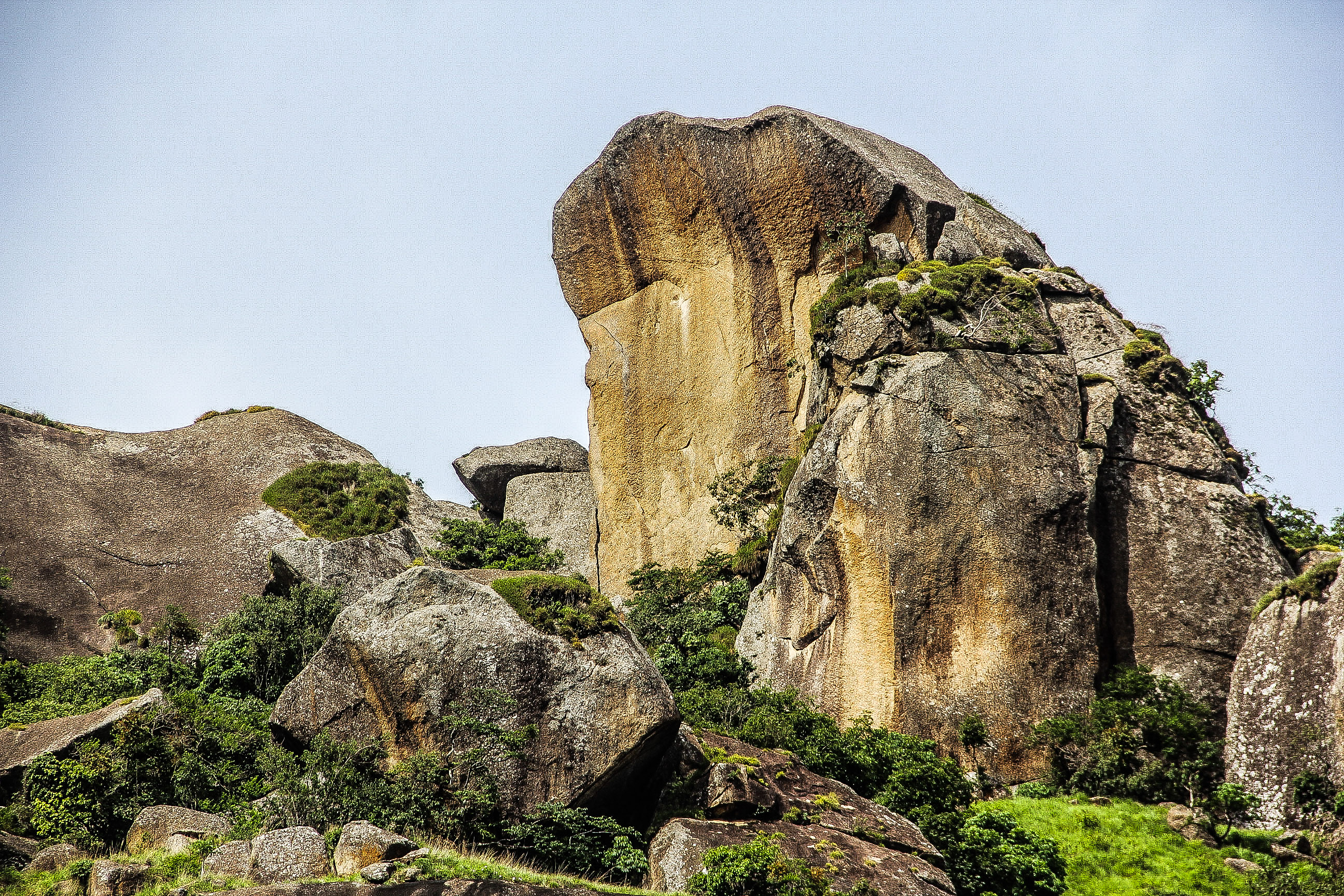
- Gworok hill in Kaura LGA
- Interactive map of Kaura
- Country: Nigeria
- State: Kaduna State
- LGA: Kaura

Government
  - Type: Democracy
  - Executive Chairman: Matthias Siman

Area
  - Total: 461 km^{2} (178 sq mi)

Population (2006)
  - Total: 174,626
  - Density: 511.4/km^{2} (1,325/sq mi)
- 2006 National Population Census
- Time zone: UTC+1 (WAT)
- 3-digit postal code prefix: 801
- ISO 3166 code: NG.KD.KA

Kaura (Tyap: Watyap) is a town and a Local Government Area in southern Kaduna State, Nigeria. The Local Government Council is chaired by Matthias Siman. Other towns include: Takad (Attakar) Manchok and Kagoro. It has an area of 461 km^{2} and a population of 174,626 at the 2006 census. The postal code of the area is 801.

== Boundaries ==
Kaura (Watyap) Local Government Area (LGA) shares boundaries with Zangon Kataf LGA to the west, Kauru LGA to the north, Jema'a LGA to the south; and Riyom LGA of Plateau State to the east, respectively.

== Administrative subdivisions ==
Kaura Local Government Area consists of 10 subdivisions (second-order administrative divisions) or electoral wards, namely:

1. Agban
2. Bondong (Gbandang)
3. Fada (Ucyio)
4. Kadarko
5. Kaura (Watyap)
6. Kpak
7. Kukum
8. Malagum (Zali)
9. Manchok (Tsok)
10. Zankan

== Population ==
Kaura Local Government Area according to the March 21, 2006 national population census was put at 174,626. Its population was projected by the National Population Commission of Nigeria and National Bureau of Statistics to be 235,700 by March 21, 2016.

== Climate ==
The rainy season, which is warm and humid, and the dry season, which is hot and partially cloudy, have different climates throughout the year.

=== Average Temperature ===
The average daily maximum temperature during the 2.7-month hot season, which runs from January 29 to April 18, is above 33 °C (91 °F). March is the hottest month in Kaura, with an average high temperature of 34 °C (94 °F) and low temperature of 19 °C (67 °F). The average daily high temperature during the 3.3-month chilly season, which runs from June 28 to October 4, is below 27 °C (81 °F). December is the coldest month of the year in Kaura, with an average high temperature of 31 °C (87 °F) and low temperature of 14 °C (58 °F).

=== Geography ===
Kaura Local Government Area has an average temperature of 32 degrees Celsius or 89.6 degrees Fahrenheit and a total area of 485 square kilometres. The dry and wet seasons are the two distinct seasons that the area experiences. Kaura's average wind speed is believed to be 11 km/h (6.8 mph), and the area receives 1,000 millimetres (39 inches) of precipitation year.

== People ==
The people of Kaura Local Government Area are homogenous, belonging to the larger Atyap (Nienzit) Ethno-Linguistic Cluster. These people include the A̱sholyia̱ (also spelt Osholio, Æsholio, A̠sholyio), 'Moro'a' in Hausa language, A̱gworok (also spelt Œgworok), also known as 'Kagoro' in Hausa language, Takad as well as the A̱tyeca̱rak also known as 'Kachechere' in Hausa language, and Atyap Proper, also known as 'Kataf' in Hausa language.

== Languages ==
The people of Kaura Local Government Area speak five inter-related dialectical varieties of the Tyap language, namely: Sholyia̱ (also spelt Sholio), Gworok, Takad (also spelt Takat), Tyeca̱rak and Tyap Proper. Kaura Local government was carved out from Jema'a local government area by the past military government of Kaduna state and it shares boundary with Plateau state, blessed with beautiful mountainous environment and good weather.

== Religion ==
The people are mostly Christians (above 95%) and a very minute percent are Abwoi adherents and Muslims.

== Traditional States ==
There are three Nigerian traditional states headed by three Agwams (monarchs):

1. The Gworok (Kagoro) Chiefdom, headed by Agwam Ufuwai Bonet (OON), Agwam Agworok (also Oegwam Oegworok).
2. The Asholyio (Moroa) Chiefdom, headed by A̠gwam Tagwai Sambo (OFR), Agwam Asholyio.
3. The Takad Chiefdom, headed by Agwam Tobias Nkom Wada, Agwam Takad.

== Notable people ==
- Agwam (Dr.) Gwamna Awan (MBE, OON), paramount ruler
- Arch. Barnabas Bala Bantex, architect, politician
- Agwam (Dr.) Ufuwai Bonet (CON), paramount ruler
- Pst. Chris Delvan Gwamna, singer, clergy
- Hon. Gideon Gwani, (minority whip) Federal House of Representatives.
- Sen. Danjuma Laah, politician
- Maj. Gen. Joshua Madaki, military service
- Prof. Andrew Nkom
- Agwam Tagwai Sambo (OFR), paramount ruler
- Sen. Nenadi Esther Usman, politician
- Hon. Sankyai Obadiah Sanko, Chairman
