= Southern Kaduna crisis =

Ethnoreligious and environmental conflict in Nigeria

The Southern Kaduna Crisis is part of a series of ethnicity conflicts in Nigeria. It is tied in with issues of religious and ethnic tension and the Fulani herdsmen crisis, as well as the growing tide of banditry and general insecurity particularly in the north of the country.

Recent years have had large numbers of people killed in incidents.

== See also ==
- Communal conflicts in Nigeria
