= Abuja–Kaduna Highway =

Highway in Nigeria

Route information
- Length: 200 km (120 mi)
- Known for: Kidnapping, banditry

Major junctions
- From: Abuja
- To: Kaduna

Location
- Country: Nigeria
- States: Kaduna; Niger; Federal Capital Territory

Highway system
- Transport in Nigeria

The Abuja–Kaduna Highway or Abuja–Kaduna Expressway is a highway in Nigeria. It connects the national capital of Abuja with the city of Kaduna. Depending on the definition used, (Note: some measurements do not include the portion which is part of the A234 highway) it is between 155 kilometres (96 mi) and 200 kilometres (120 mi) in length. It is primarily part of the A2 highway but the section nearest Abuja is part of the A234 highway.

The highway has gained a reputation for being unsafe for travellers, and has been described as "the most dangerous road in the country", due to violent kidnappings and murders. The highway was blocked by commercial vehicle drivers in August 2019, following the killing of a driver who refused to give a bribe to a police officer after being caught smuggling rice. The highway was again blocked by protesters in May 2021, in an effort to force the government to address the safety issues on the road.

The police and army have cooperated to in an effort to restore both safety and public confidence in the road. The Nigerian Army under Operation Thunder Strike, and the Nigeria Police Force under Operation Puff Adder have worked to clear the highway and the surrounding areas of insurgents and bandits. In April 2022, the highway was declared "safe" and "free of bandits" by Police. However on 17 May 2022, a major blockade was conducted and at least 20 people were kidnapped, and an unknown number were killed. On 19 May, the Kaduna state governor Nasir El-Rufai announced that several communities along the highway would be relocated, as residents were suspected of assisting and colluding with kidnappers. However some residents protested this, stating that only a small number of people were involved in criminal activity, and it would be more suitable to target those individuals than relocate the communities.
