= Gwamna Awan =

Monarch of Gworog (Kagoro) Chiefdom

Əgwam (Dr.) Gwamna Awan (MBE, OON)

Monarch of Gworog (Kagoro) Chiefdom
- In office: 1945 – 1 October 2008
- 3rd Class: 1945
- Predecessor: Əgwam Biya Kaka Əgwam Əgworog IV
- Successor: Əgwam Ufuwai Bonet (CON, JP), Əgwam Agworog VI
- Born: 1915; Ucyo (Fadan Kagoro), Northern Region, British Nigeria
- Died: 1 October 2008 (aged 92–93); Jos, Nigeria
- Burial: Palace at Ucyo, Gworog
- Spouse: Talatu Gwamna Awan
Names
- English: Gwamna Danladi Awan
- House: Ucyo, Gworog
- Father: Awan Batwab
- Mother: Kwada Bagyad
- Religion: Evangelical Christianity

Gwamna Danladi Awan (1915 – 1 October 2008) was the monarch of Gworog (Kagoro) Chiefdom, a Nigerian traditional state and was reputed to be the longest served monarch in Nigeria and second oldest in Africa, reigning for 63 years (1945–2008). He was also known by the title Chief of Kagoro.

== Life and education ==
Gwamna Awan was born in Ucyo (Fadan Kagoro) in 1915. Earlier on, his father, Awan, was adopted by his granduncle, the fourth monarch of Gworog, Biya Kaka. His educational career began in 1928 where all through till 1932 he attended evening classes, before proceeding to the Elementary Teachers Centre, Toro (now in Bauchi State) between 1933 and 1935.

== Career ==
As soon as the program ended at Toro, Awan returned home to begin teaching at the Sudan Interior Mission (SIM) Elementary School, Gworog (Kagoro) from 1936. He was later transferred to the Sudan Interior Mission (SIM) Elementary School, Fantswam (Kafanchan) in 1938. In the course of his early career, he combined where combined teaching with evangelism, as did the Christian missionaries. After about a year in 1939, he returned to teach at the Elementary Teachers Centre in Gworog.

When uncle, Biya Kaka, the then Chief of Kagoro needed him to join the Gworog (Kagoro) Native Authority, he was available and was made the Assistant Scribe in 1940. He was instrumental in the execution of many developmental projects the construction of a modern (the present) palace in 1943, as well as manual water pumps at the front of the palace for the people to have access to clean water. He also improved on the tax collection system and promoted education of the citizens of the chiefdom.

== Kingship ==
=== Royal tussle ===
After the demise of Chief Biya Kaka in August 1944, there was a delay in the appointment of a successor due to the tussle over who should become the next monarch. There were two candidates vying for the position: an animist and a Christian in the person of Gwamna Awan who got strong backing from the Sudan Interior Mission (SIM) who pressured the British colonial authorities to select their candidate to succeed Kaka. At the end, Awan was appointed the acting Chief, and subsequently installed formally as the first Christian monarch in the whole of the southern part of Zaria Province and 5th Chief of Kagoro by G. D. Pitcairn, the British colonial Resident of Zaria Province on 11 April 1945.

=== Challenges ===
Awan's ascendancy was to the SIM missionaries a major breakthrough to spread Christianity across the region. Already, they had made Gworok town their headquarters in the southern part of Zaria province. However, his ascendancy was seen as a threat to the Zaria Emirate aristocrats who envisaged a danger to their interest in the Atyap area and the neighborhood due to the continuous enlightenment through education; Christian missionary activities by the SIM and its members; and more threatening, the tendency of the new western-educated Christian chief aiding the Atyap against them.

In May 1946, there was a revolt by the Atyap in the Zangon Katab district, north of the independent Chiefdom of Gworog, who wanted their separation from the Zaria Emirate and the creation of an Atyap Chiefdom and Awan was blamed by the Emir of Zaria, as reported by the British colonial Resident, G. D. Pitcairn, for escalating the crisis.

In the report, Pitcairn wrote:

"The Emir is very bitter about Sarkin Kagoro himself and seems at all times to blame the Chief of Kagoro for all Katab troubles... The influence of Kagoro has been very powerful, certainly, and as much perhaps by its standing as an example of an independent tribe as by the propaganda of boys and youths trained by the SIM there."

On a subsequent visit to Gworog (Kagoro) by Pitcairn where he met with Awan to confirm the Emir's allegations, he ended up warning Awan to avoid such acts.

== Death ==
Gwamna Awan was the longest-serving traditional ruler in Northern and Middle Belt (central) and the entire Nigeria and in Africa as at the time of his demise in the early morning hours of Wednesday 1 October 2008, at the age of 93 at the ECWA Evangelical Hospital, Jos, after a protracted illness.

Among other monarchs of the old Northern Region of Colonial Nigeria, like Attah of Igala, Aliyu Obaje (56 years); Sultan of Sokoto, Abubakar III (50 years); Emir of Kano, Ado Bayero (51 years); Emir of Daura, Muhammadu Bashar (41 years); Lamido of Adamawa, Aliyu Mustapha (57 years); Sarkin Katagum, Muhammadu Kabir (37 years); Emir of Lafia, Mustafa Agwai (43 years); Emir of Daura, Abdurrahman (1911–1966); Awan had the longest reign of 63 years.

== Legacy ==
A hospital, Dr. Gwamna Awan General Hospital was named after him.
