= Ufuwai Bonet =

Agwam Ufuwai Bonet (CON)
- His Royal Highness
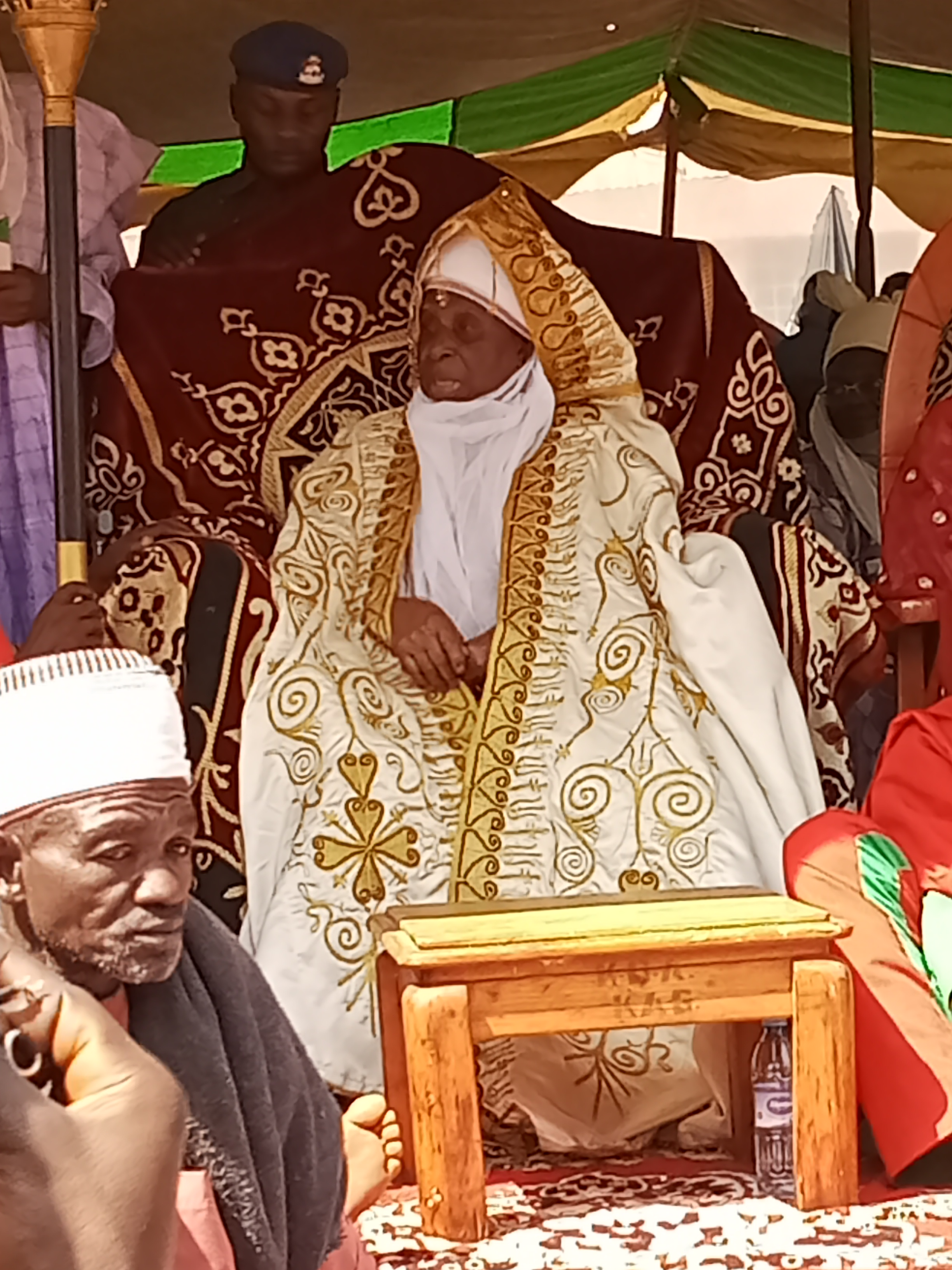
- Agwam Bonet during Afan Festival in January 2024.

Monarch of Gworok (Kagoro) Chiefdom
- In office: 2008 – date
- Coronation: 2008
- Predecessor: Agwam (Dr.) Gwamna Awan (MBE, OON)
Names
- English: Ufuwai Bonet
- Religion: Evangelical Christianity

Ufuwai Bonet is the monarch of Gworok (Kagoro) Chiefdom, a Nigerian traditional state in southern Kaduna State, Nigeria. He is also known by the title "Chief of Kagoro (Gworok)". As of 2016, he is the deputy chairman of the Kaduna State council of chiefs and emirs.

In 2011, he led the Kaduna State Christians to pilgrimage in Israel, Egypt, Rome and Greece, in which two absconded.

In January 2017, while addressing the Nigerian Chief of Defense Staff, General Abayomi Olonisakin on a visit to his palace after the attacks by Fulani terrorists, he assured:

“If you hear anything happening, our people just go on revenge, they never attacked. Am telling you this between me and my God..."

Later in February, in an address to the CAN, over the same issue, Bonet admonished:

“CAN should approach the leaders and prevail on them to make statements on what their people are doing. They have moved down to the south, nowhere is safe. You have a job to do to get all the Christians together so that we can be one.”

He also decried the security situation in the area during the 2019 edition of the Afan National Cultural Festival, which he hosted.

During the COVID-19 lockdown in 2020, he urged the people, village and ward heads in his realm to abide by the lockdown orders as liquor sellers hesitated to comply.
