= Kagoro =

Kagoro Gworog
- Chiefdom and Town
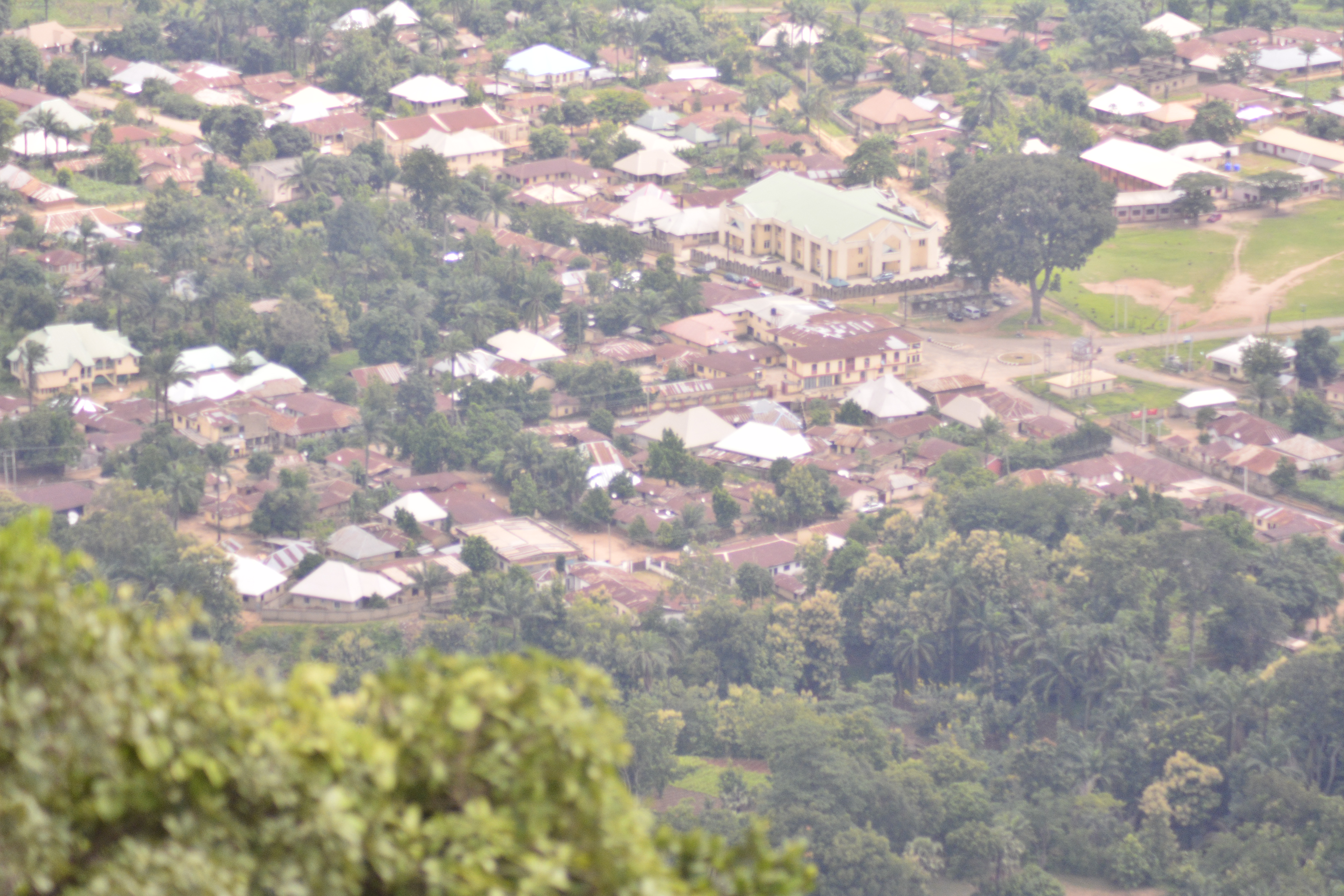
- Ucyio (Fada) from the mountaintop.
- Nickname: k kola
- Location in Nigeria
- Coordinates: 9°36′N 8°23′E
- Country: Nigeria
- State: Kaduna State
- LGA: Kaura
- Chiefdom: Gworok (Kagoro)
- Established: 1905

Government
  - Type: Elective monarchy
  - Əgwam Əgworog (Əgwam Əgworog): HH Əgwam (Dr.) Ufuwai Bonet (CON)
- Elevation: 811.85 m (2,663.5 ft)
- Time zone: UTC+1 (WAT)

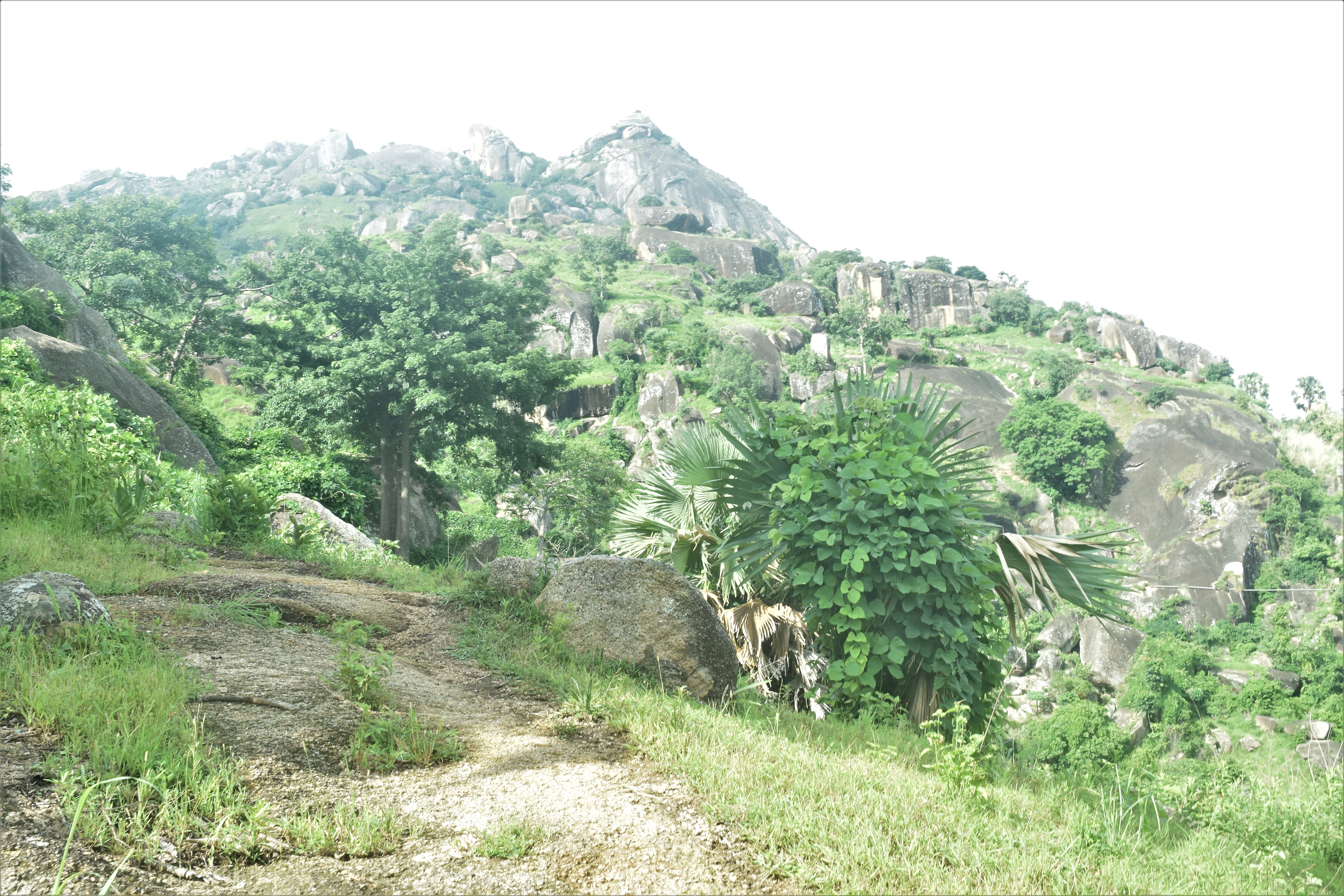
Akatan (peaks) of the Gworog mountains

Gworok (also Gworog, Gwoot; Hausa: Kagoro) is a large town in southern Kaduna State, Middle Belt Nigeria. It is located in the Kaura Local Government Area. Gworok is a Christian-dominated town. It is home to many missionaries, attracted by the cool weather and relatively high altitude. Gworog has a post office. Other places in Kagoro are Malagum and Tum.

== Geography ==
=== Landscape ===
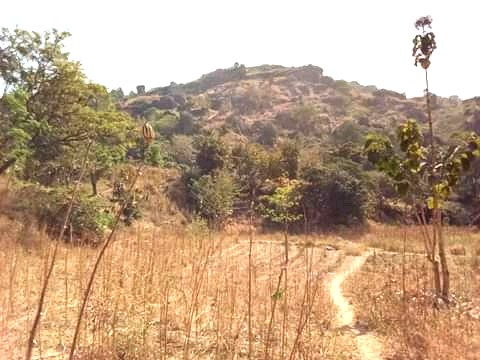
Gworok (Kagoro) Hills

The Gworog or Kagoro Hills possesses an elevation of 1,152 m (3,780 ft) and a prominence of 120 m (390 ft).

=== Climate ===
Gworog has an average annual temperature of about 24.8 °C (76.6 °F), average yearly highs of about 28.6 °C (83.5 °F) and lows of 18.8 °C (65.8 °F). The town has zero rainfalls at the ends and beginnings of the year with a yearly average precipitation of about 28.1 mm (1.11 in), and an average humidity of 53.7%, similar to that of Zangon Kataf, Zonkwa and Kafanchan.

Climate data for Kagoro (811.85 m, 2,663.5 ft altitude)
Month	Jan	Feb	Mar	Apr	May	Jun	Jul	Aug	Sep	Oct	Nov	Dec	Year
Record high °C (°F)	31 (88)	33 (91)	34 (93)	34 (93)	31 (88)	29 (84)	26 (79)	25 (77)	27 (81)	29 (84)	30 (86)	29 (84)	29.8 (85.6)
Mean daily maximum °C (°F)	29 (84)	32 (90)	34 (93)	33 (91)	30 (86)	27 (81)	24 (75)	22 (72)	24 (75)	28 (82)	29 (84)	31 (88)	28.6 (83.5)
Daily mean °C (°F)	24 (75)	26 (79)	29 (84)	29 (84)	26 (79)	24 (75)	21 (70)	20 (68)	22 (72)	25 (77)	25 (77)	26 (79)	24.8 (76.6)
Mean daily minimum °C (°F)	15 (59)	17 (63)	21 (70)	22 (72)	20 (68)	19 (66)	18 (64)	17 (63)	18 (64)	20 (68)	19 (66)	19 (66)	18.8 (65.8)
Record low °C (°F)	14 (57)	16 (61)	20 (68)	21 (70)	21 (70)	20 (68)	19 (66)	18 (64)	19 (66)	19 (66)	18 (64)	15 (59)	18.3 (64.9)
Average precipitation mm (inches)	0 (0)	1 (0.0)	3.1 (0.12)	13.5 (0.53)	35.5 (1.40)	54.2 (2.13)	71.2 (2.80)	69 (2.7)	60.3 (2.37)	29.3 (1.15)	0.1 (0.00)	0 (0)	28.1 (1.11)
Average precipitation days	0	1	4	12	23	28	31	30	29	18	0	0	14.7
Average relative humidity (%)	24	18	28	48	66	80	88	90	86	61	32	23	53.7
Source: World Weather Online

== Education ==
The Catholic Society of African Missions (SMA) has its northern Nigeria headquarters in Gworok, and the Evangelical Church Winning All (ECWA) denomination has a strong presence there, with both a theological college and a School of Health Technology.

== Economy ==
=== Tourism ===
Gworog is attractive for tourists because of its mountainous scenery and cultural events such as the Afan Festival, a National festival which is celebrated annually on 1 January.

==== Cultural festivals ====
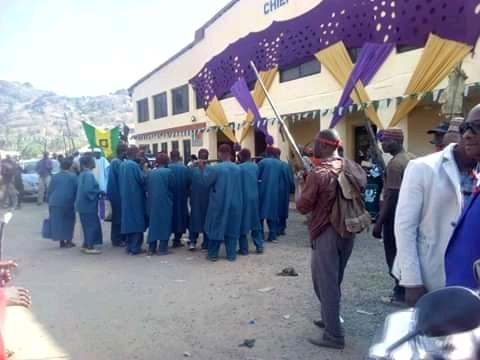
Royal horn blowers and hunters before the palace of the Chief of Kagoro.

Gworog is notable for its Afan National Festival, celebrated on January 1 of every year, with people coming from different parts of the country to join the celebration.

=== Hospitality ===
The town has a number of motels for visitors.

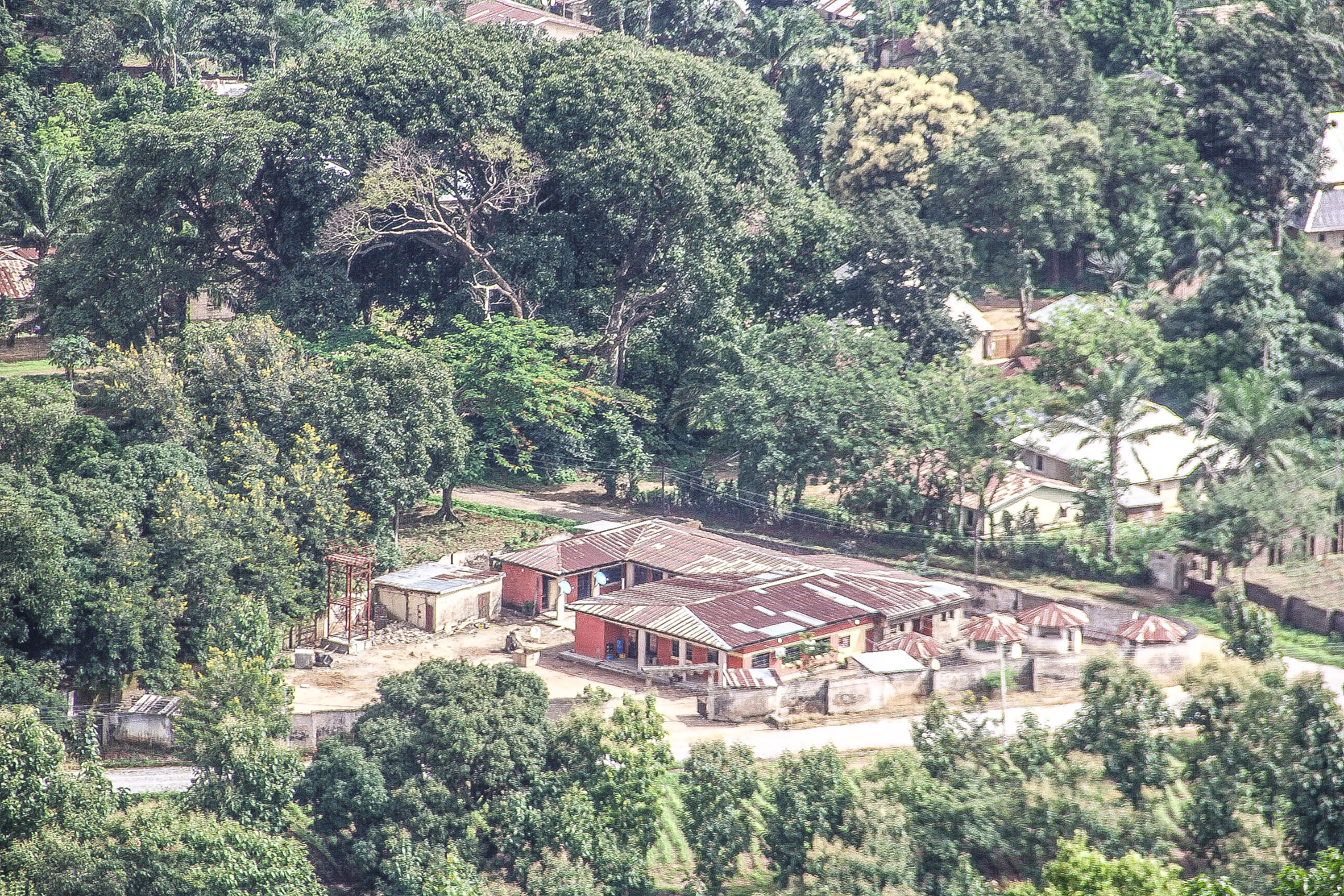
Labesta Guess Inn from the Afan Agworok mountaintop.

== History ==
The Gworog (Kagoro) Chiefdom was created in 1905 by the British colonial administration as one of the three independent Districts in Southern Zaria province (now Southern Kaduna). As of 2020, it is a First-Class Chiefdom with its capital at Ucyo (H. Fadan Kagoro). Its rulers, as are known by the name, "Əgwam."

During the long reign of the late Chief Dr. Gwamna Awan (MBE, OON), Gworog was considered strategic during political campaigning, as politicians would visit him to receive his blessing and endorsement. The current as of early 2021 is Əgwam Əgworog (Chief of Gworog (Kagoro)) Əgwam Ufuwai Bonet (CON).

== Language ==
The people of Gworog (the Əgworog) speak Gworog language

=== Counting in Gworog ===
1. Ənyyuŋ
2. Əfyyaŋ
3. Ətad
4. Ənay
5. Ətswon
6. Uta
7. Natad
8. Unaymbwag
9. Kubanyyuŋ
10. Swag
11. Swag bə ənyyuŋ
12. Swag bə əfyyaŋ
13. Swag bə ətad
14. Swag bə ənay
15. Swag bə ətswon
16. Swag bə uta
17. Swag bə natad
18. Swag bə unaymbwag
19. Swag bə kubanyyuŋ
20. Nswag nfyyaŋ

== Notable people ==
- Lois Auta, an activist, founder and CEO of Cedar Seed Foundation
- Dr. Gwamna Awan (MBE, OON): One of the lonɡest-served monarchs in Africa (63 years on the throne, 1945 - 2008).
- Pst. Chris Delvan Gwamna Ajiyat: A minister of the Gospel and singer based in Kaduna, Nigeria.
- Sen. Danjuma Laah: Senator representinɡ Kaduna South Senatorial District (2015 - 2023).
- William Barnabas Qurix (b. 1961), university administrator, educationist, and researcher
- Sen. Nenadi Esther Usman, Nigerian Minister of Finance (2006 - 2007); Senator representing Kaduna South Senatorial District (2011 - 2015)

== See also ==
- List of villages in Kaduna State
- Southern Kaduna
