= Antang =

Antang Anta, Antan
- Village and district
- Location within Nigeria
- Coordinates: 09°26′54″N 08°27′37″E
- Country: Nigeria
- State: Kaduna State
- LGA: Jema'a
- Ward: Gidan Waya
- Elevation: 563.88 m (1,850.0 ft)
- Time zone: UTC+01:00 (WAT)
- Postal code: 801
- Climate: Aw

Antang is a village and district in Jema'a Local Government Area, southern Kaduna State, Middle Belt, Nigeria. It is located 163.93 km from the state capital, Kaduna. The postal code of the area is 801. The village is 1,850 ft (563.88 m) above sea level.

== Geography ==
Antang is located southwest of the Jos Plateau between latitude 9°15'N and 9°36'N and longitude 8° and 8°10'E. The district is approximately 23 km^{2}. It has a relatively flat topography, with its northeastern side about 549 m above sea level in altitude. The area largely belongs to the Precambrian age, with igneous and metamorphic rocks (gneiss and schist). Due to the high level of its soil's drainage and oxidation, it looks reddish. The district is characterized by a tropical climate with temperatures ranging between 22°C to 24°C all year round and a mean annual rainfall of between 1,000 mm and 1,750 mm. The district has a vegetation made up of transitional woodland, consisting of species like Oliverii, Domana, Vitex, Diospyros, Mespiloformus, Khaya, Grandiflora, and Albizia Africana, and Daniela.

== Mining ==
A study in 2014 has shown that there had been a high rate of illegal mining activities in Antang, and surrounding villages like Nisama, Kanufi, and Atuku. The same study stated that this illicit mining enormously increased since the establishment of mining companies in the area in the 1960s to mine prospected gems such as sapphire, tourmaline, aquamarine, amethyst, topaz, ruby, and zircon. Mining companies continued operating in the area including other places as Gidan Waya, Godogodo, Golgofa, Kafanchan, and Dangoma up until the late 1980s when the European miners left. Before that, tens of Senegalese, Malian, and Gambian migrants worked side-by-side with indigenous populations in such mines. As of 2019, the mining of tin ore in the area was ongoing.

Another study in 2021 revealed that mining activities by artisans around the Antang area have brought about the contamination of its groundwater. The laboratory result of the control samples collected from nearby Gidan Waya shows that pollutants were in higher concentration in the water from Antang and the environs compared to that from Gidan Waya. These pollutants in the underground water were found to have a long-term effect on the health of the inhabitants of the area, although many of the collected sample variables measured still surpass the acceptable limit set by the National Standard of Nigeria and by the World Health Organization.

== Fulani terror attacks and bandit raids ==
Antang and nearby areas of Southern Kaduna had since about 2016 remained under the radar of Fulani attacks as part of the larger Mass killings in Southern Kaduna.

The area is also said to be prone to bandit raids. This is partly due to the poor road infrastructure linking Southern Kaduna to Jos.

== See also ==
- List of villages in Kaduna State
