= Jema'a =

Jema'a Ajemaa Jama'a
- LGA and Town
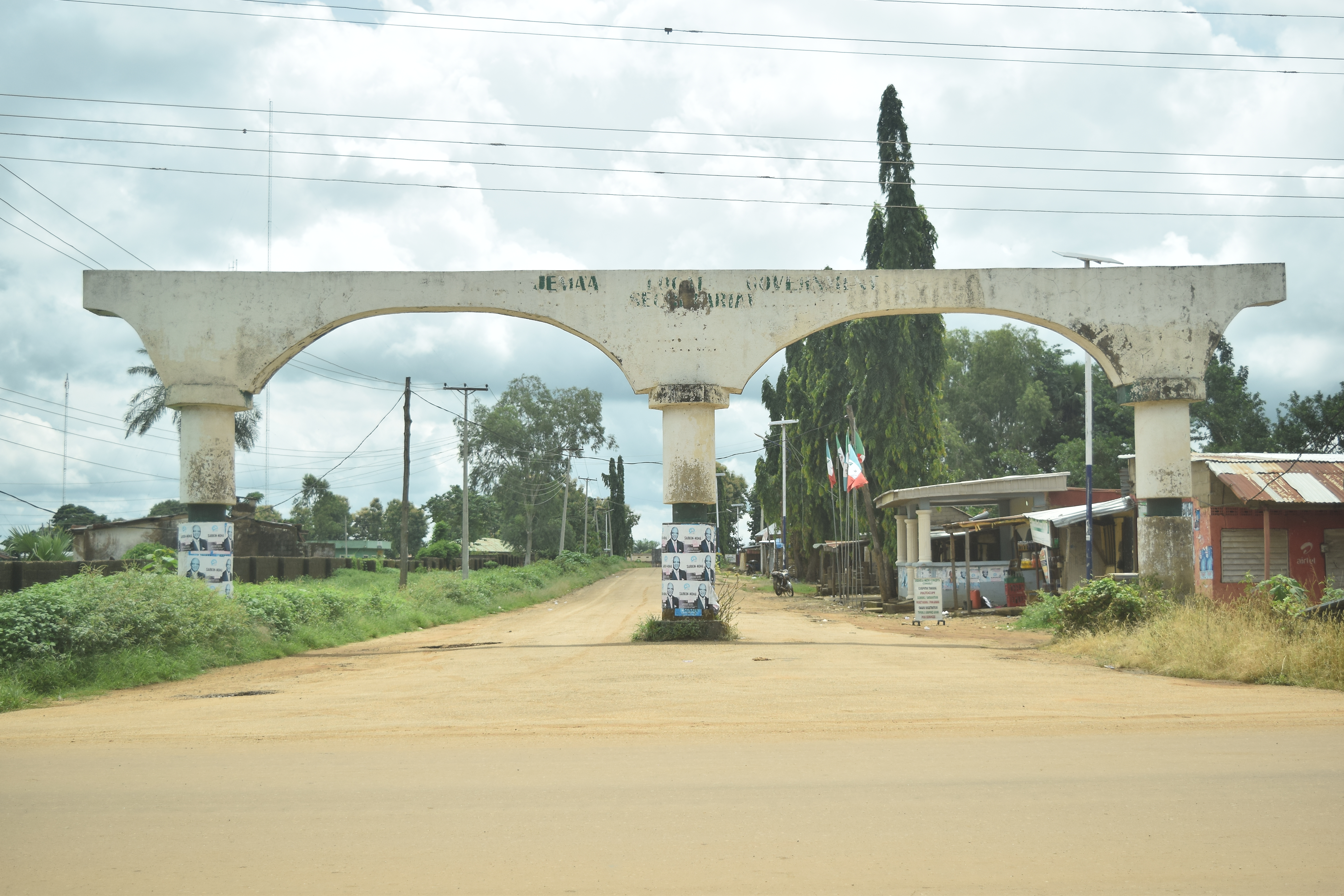
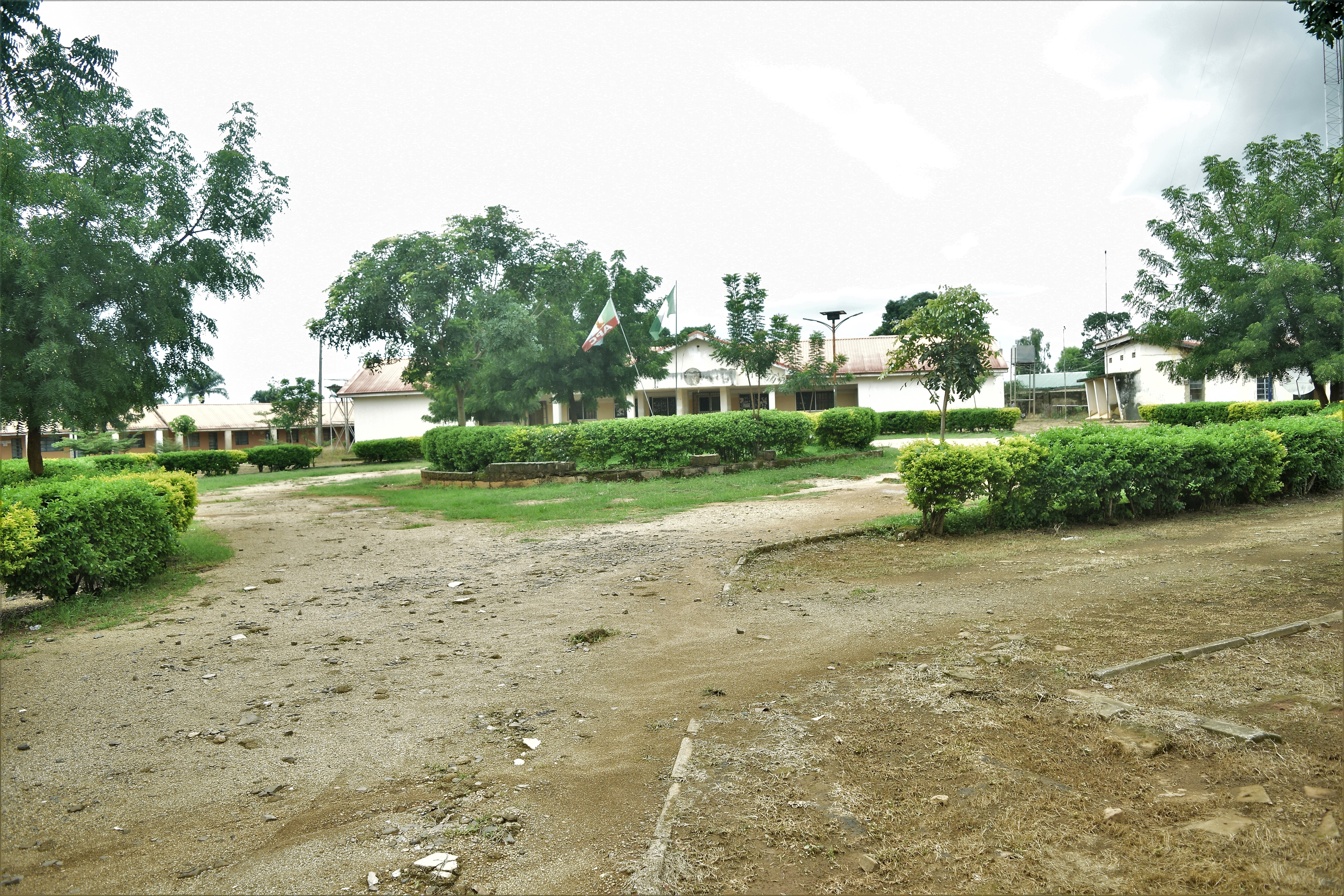
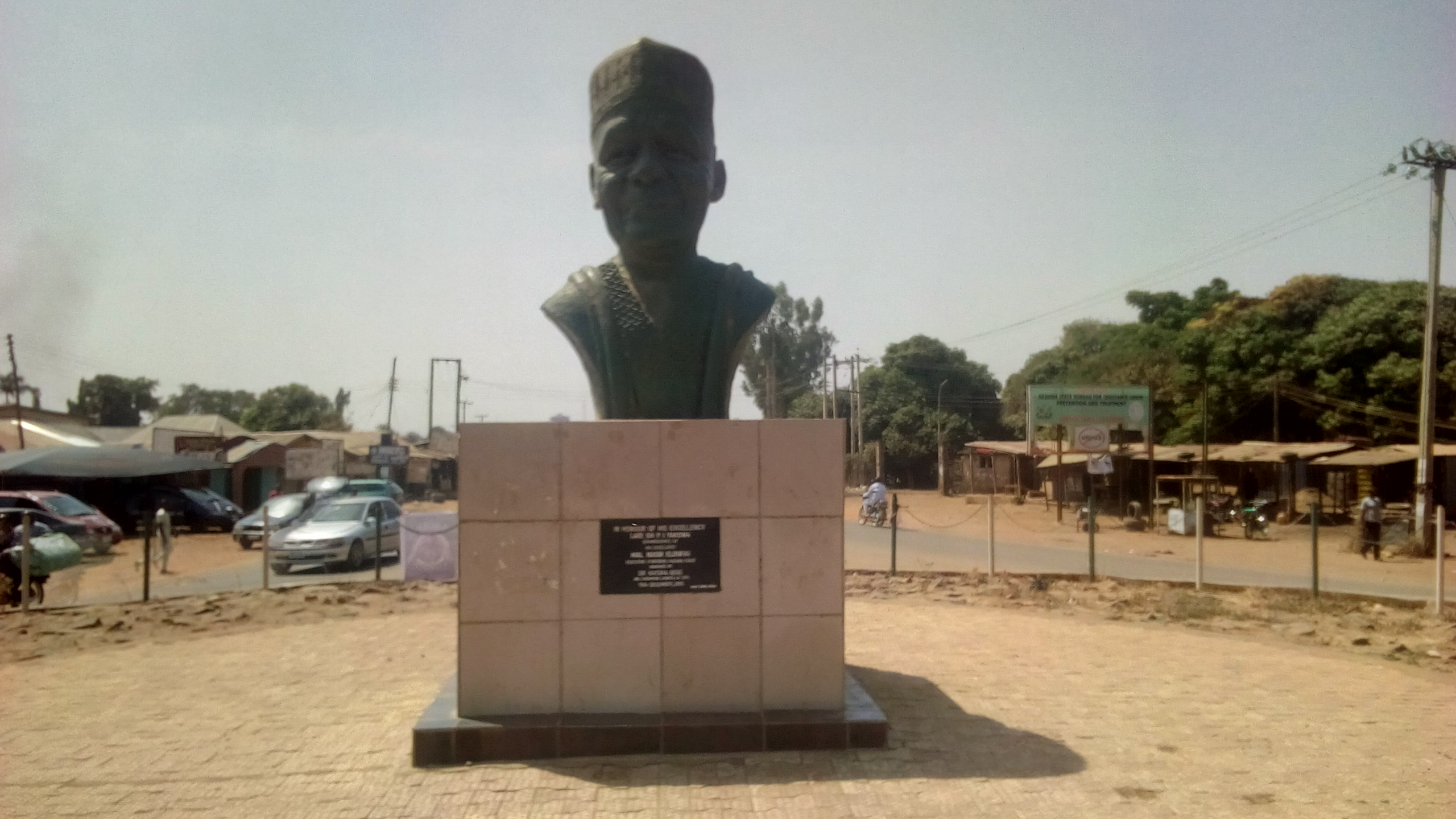
- Clockwise from top: Entrance, Jemaa LGA Secretariat, Kafanchan; A Bust of Patrick Yakowa, Kafanchan; Jemaa LGA Secretariat
- Interactive map of Jema'a
- Country: Nigeria
- State: Kaduna State
- Headquarters: Kafanchan

Government
  - Type: Democracy
  - Executive Chairman: Yunana Barde

Area
  - Total: 1,384 km^{2} (534 sq mi)

Population (2006)
  - Total: 278,202
  - Density: 271.4/km^{2} (703/sq mi)
- 2006 National Census
- Time zone: UTC+1 (WAT)
- Postal code: 801
- ISO 3166 code: NG.KD.JE

Jema'a (also written Ajemaa and Jama'a) is a town and Local Government Area in southern Kaduna State, Nigeria with headquarters at Kafanchan. The Local Government Council is chaired by Yunana Barde. It has an area of 1,384 km^{2} and a population of 278,202 at the 2006 census. The postal code of the area is 801.

== Geography ==
=== Landscape ===
Jema'a Local Government Area lies on a broad low - lying topography with gently rolling plains on either side. it is flanked by two rivers. To the northwestern side of the area is the Amere or Mada river popularly referred to as River Wonderful by the people because it has claimed many lives including those of some of the colonial engineers during the rail bridge construction at Aduwan (another bridge build on the same river during the British colonial era exists near Kogum River Station). The second river to the southeast is the Sanga (or the Kogum River) sourced from the plateau. Both rivers merge close to the Kogum River Station. There lie in addition, numerous hills, valleys streams. The undulating lands also provide fertile grounds for agricultural activities. The area has an average humidity of thirty percent and an average wind speed of eleven kilometres per hour (seven miles per hour).

=== Climate conditionn ===
Jema’a Local Government Area experiences a tropical wet-and-dry climate with a warm and humid rainy season followed by a hot and partly cloudy dry season. Recent weather-data show daytime temperatures around 25–28 °C (77–82 °F) during cloudy or rainy periods, with nighttime lows near 20 °C (68 °F), high humidity (often above 80-90 %) and frequent thunderstorms during the rainy months. The onset of the rainy season typically brings heavy rain, thunderstorms and high cloud cover, while the dry season has lower humidity, less rainfall, and increased sunshine hours.

== Government and politics ==
=== Boundaries ===
Jema'a Local Government Area (LGA) shares boundaries with Zangon Kataf LGA to the north, Jaba LGA to the west, Sanga LGA to the east, Kaura LGA to the northeast; Riyom LGA of Plateau State to the east and Karu LGA of Nasarawa State to the south respectively.

=== Administrative subdivisions ===
Jema'a Local Government Area consists of 12 subdivisions (second-order administrative divisions) namely:

1. Asso
2. Atuku
3. Barde
4. Gidan Waya (formerly Jema'a)
5. Godogodo
6. Jagindi
7. Kafanchan A
8. Kafanchan B
9. Kagoma (Gwong)
10. Kaninkon (Nikyob)
11. Maigizo (Kadajya)
12. Takau

== Demographics ==
=== People ===
Jema'a Local Government Area consist of a number of related ethnic groups and subgroups as well as a migrant population from other parts of the country, especially in the Local Government Area headquarters of Kafanchan .

The ethnic groups and subgroups in Jema'a LGA include: hausa people (hausa), Numana people Numana, Fulani, Gwong, Nikyob, Nindem and Nyankpa. Others are: Atyap, Bajju, Berom, Gwong, Atuku, Ham, Igbo and Yoruba.

=== Population ===
According to the March 21, 2006 national population census, Jema'a (Ajemaa) had a population of 278,202. Its population was projected by the National Population Commission of Nigeria to be 375,500 by March 21, 2016.

== Economy ==
The people of the local government are predominantly farmers, cultivating cash crops such as cotton, peanuts and ginger; and food crops such as corn, millet and sorghum in subsistent qualities. There is also an old tin mining tunnel site in the town of Godogodo.

== Notable people ==
- Joseph Bagobiri, First Bishop of Catholic Diocese Kafanchan and clergy
- Musa Didam, paramount ruler
- Joe El, singer, songwriter
- Josiah Kantiyok, consultant, paramount ruler
- Victor Moses, footballer
- Patrick Yakowa, former state governor
- Luka Yusuf, military service
