= Maigizo =

Maigizo Ungwa Maigizoh Kadajya
- Ward
- Location within Nigeria
- Coordinates: 09°35′N 08°18′E
- Country: Nigeria
- State: Kaduna State
- LGA: Jema'a
- Time zone: UTC+01:00 (WAT)
- Postal code: 801139
- Climate: Aw

Maigizo (also spelled/called Kadajya) is one of the 12 wards within the Manyii district (Kafanchan) Chiefdom of Jema'a Local Government Area in southern Kaduna state in the Middle Belt region of Nigeria. It is a primarily residential area that has seen some recent infrastructural development and is a community of mixed religious and ethnic groups. The postal code of the area is 801136.

== Demographics ==
=== Population and religion ===
The community is notably populated by Christians, served by the ECWA Church in Maigizo. As with the broader Jema'a LGA, it is home to a mix of ethnic groups, including the Hausa, Numana, Fulani, Gwong, Nikyob, and Nindem peoples. In the urban areas, parts of Maigizo, such as Kafanchan Kurmi and Adwan, are recognized as the populated places within that area.
