= Atuku =

Atuku Atukum, Tukum
- Village and Ward
- Location within Nigeria
- Coordinates: 09°29′10″N 08°28′17″E
- Country: Nigeria
- State: Kaduna State
- LGA: Jema'a
- Time zone: UTC+01:00 (WAT)
- Postal code: 801
- Climate: Aw

Atuku is a village and a second-order administrative division in Jema'a Local Government Area, southern Kaduna State, Middle Belt, Nigeria. It is located 159.08 km from the state capital, Kaduna. The postal code of the area is 801.

== Villages ==
Atuku ward has the following villages:

- Akau
- Assob Barshi
- Atuku
- Bijik
- Dogon Fili
- Kato
- Mafan (Tuku Tuzi)
- Tajan Kasa
- Tafan
- Tuku Kasa

== Fulani terror attacks ==
Atuku ward and neighboring areas of Southern Kaduna had since 2016 been invaded repeatedly in the Fulani terror attacks. The attacks are a part of the larger mass killings in Southern Kaduna.

== See also ==
- List of villages in Kaduna State
