= Jagindi =

- Village
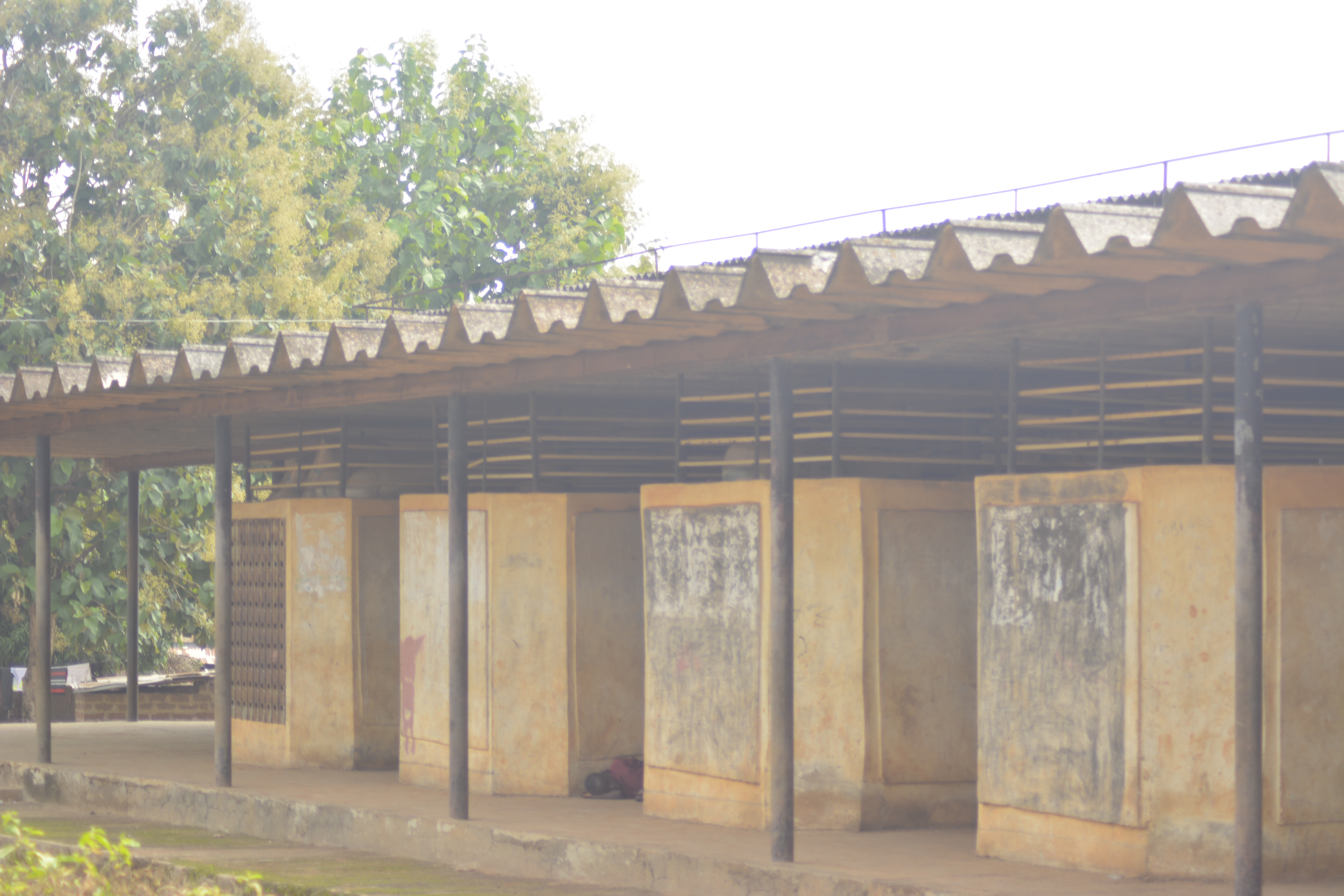
- A Photo of the old NIPOST at Jagindi Tasha

- Location within Nigeria
- Coordinates: 09°23′03″N 08°12′29″E
- Country: Nigeria
- State: Kaduna State
- LGA: Jema'a
- District: Jagindi
- Time zone: UTC+01:00 (WAT)
- Climate: Aw

Jagindi is a district community in Jama'a Local Government Area, southern Kaduna state in the Middle Belt region of Nigeria. Jagindi is a place nearby to the locality Baloje, towards Kwagiri area too. Populated place - a city, town, village, or gathered into a group of buildings where people live and work The postal code for the village is 801150.
