= Kaduna State College of Education =

Colleges of education in kaduna state, Nigeria

Coordinates: 9.43278°N 8.42952°E

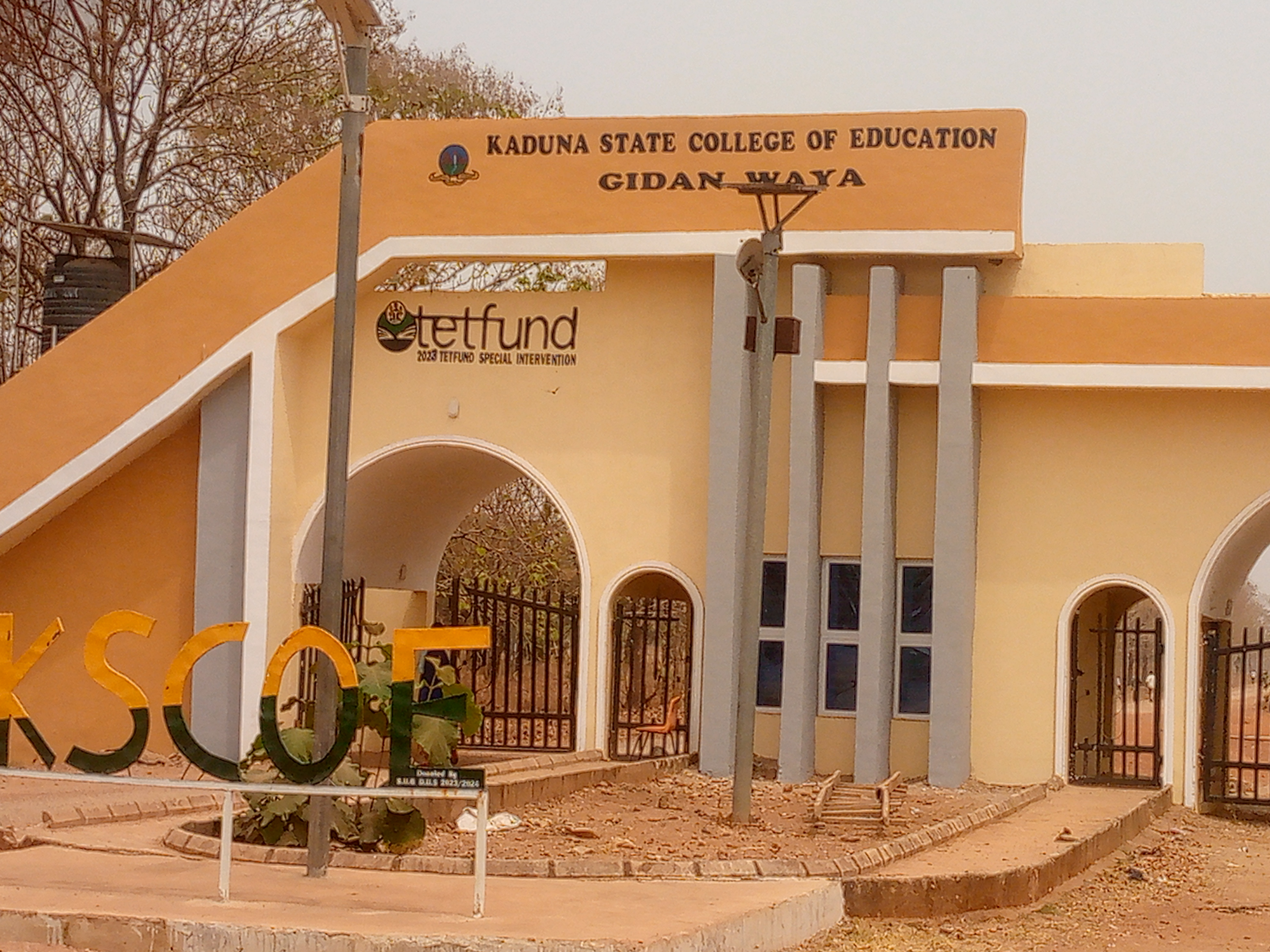
- Main entrance, KSCOE, Gidan Waya
- Type: Public
- Established: 1977
- Provost: Alexander Kure
- Location: Kafanchan, Kaduna State, Nigeria
- Affiliations: Ahmadu Bello University

The Kaduna State College of Education is a state government higher education institution located in Gidan Waya, Kafanchan, Kaduna State, Nigeria. It is affiliated to Ahmadu Bello University for its degree programmes. Aku Ambi is the current provost Kaduna State college of education, Gidan Waya.

== History ==
The college, with the name Advanced Teachers' College, Kafanchan, began formal classes on 30 March 1977 on its first campus at Manchock. On the ground were a teaching staff strength of 17 and a student population of 186. The Kaduna State Ministry of Education was the supervising agency under the government of Wing Commander Usman Jibril while Paul Turton was the first Principal of the College. The first Governing Council of the College was established in October 1978. This was under the chairmanship of Mallam Gwamna Awan, Chief of Kagoro.

The Department of Technical and Commercial Education, now Business Education, came into existence in 1980 on the second campus. The College operated a crash program which saw three batches of Nigerian Certificate in Education (NCE) students graduating in two years each. This ended in June 1981. The College gained autonomy and was no longer directly administered by the State Ministry of Education. It was affiliated to Ahmadu Bello University (ABU) Zaria in 1980. By 1988, the College began the process of movement to its permanent site at Gidan Waya. At present 80% of the movement has been completed. The Technical and Fine and Applied Arts departments are still at the temporary site in Kafanchan. As of 2022 the College ran more than 29 NCE academic programs with 15 fully accredited and 14 having interim accreditation. These are regulated by the NCCE. The College has advanced from an initial student population of 186 in 1977 to over 15,652 students in 2022. These include NCE Part-Time students. The Staff strength has also grown from 981 in 2016 to 1,084 in 2022..

== Library ==
The college Library was established in 1977 to meet the information needs of both staff and students of the college with over 1,000 seating capacity at a time. the college library has total collection of 23,000 volumes of books and e-library section with over 60 computers with Internet connectivity.

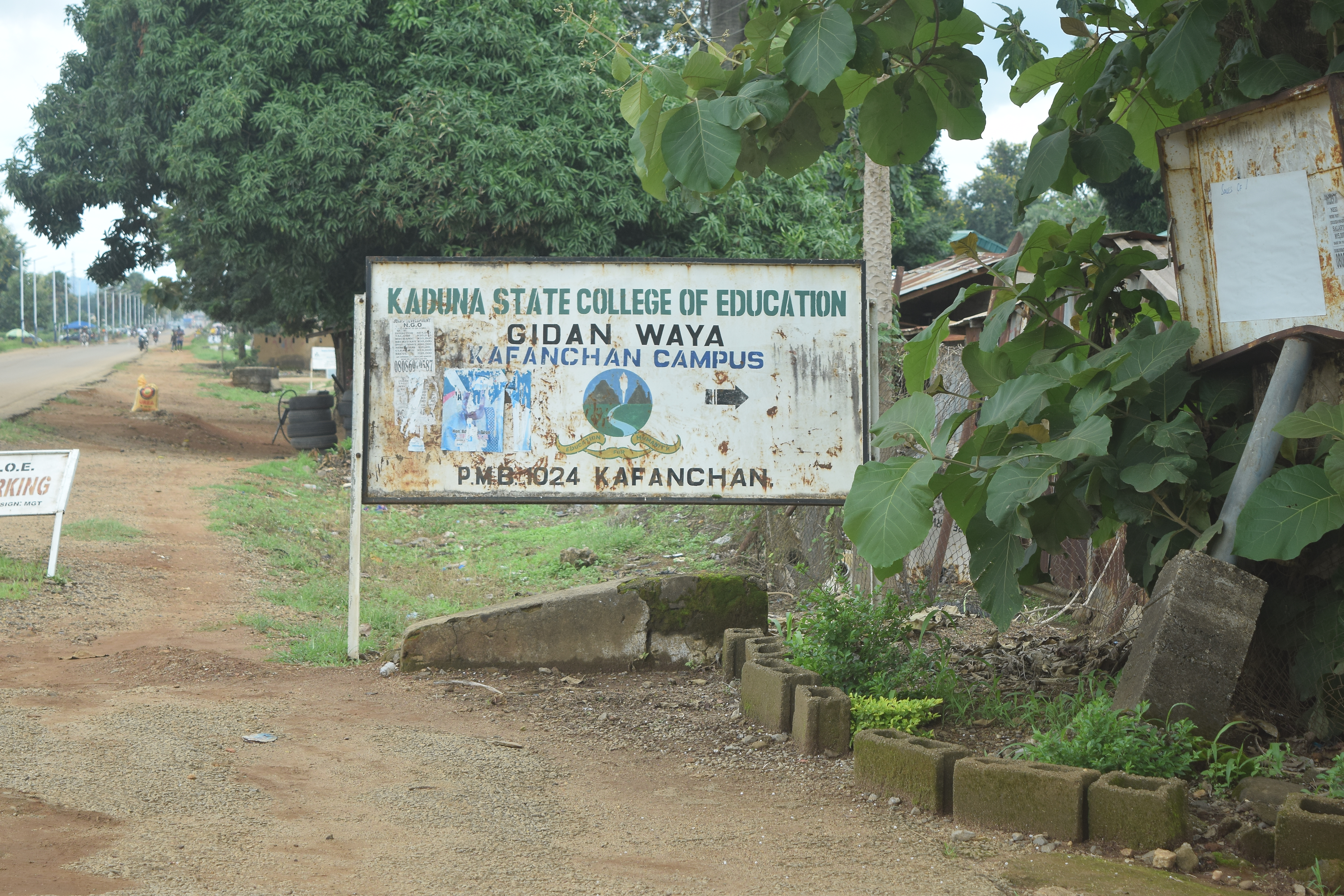
KSCOE Kafanchan Campus signpost at Garaje

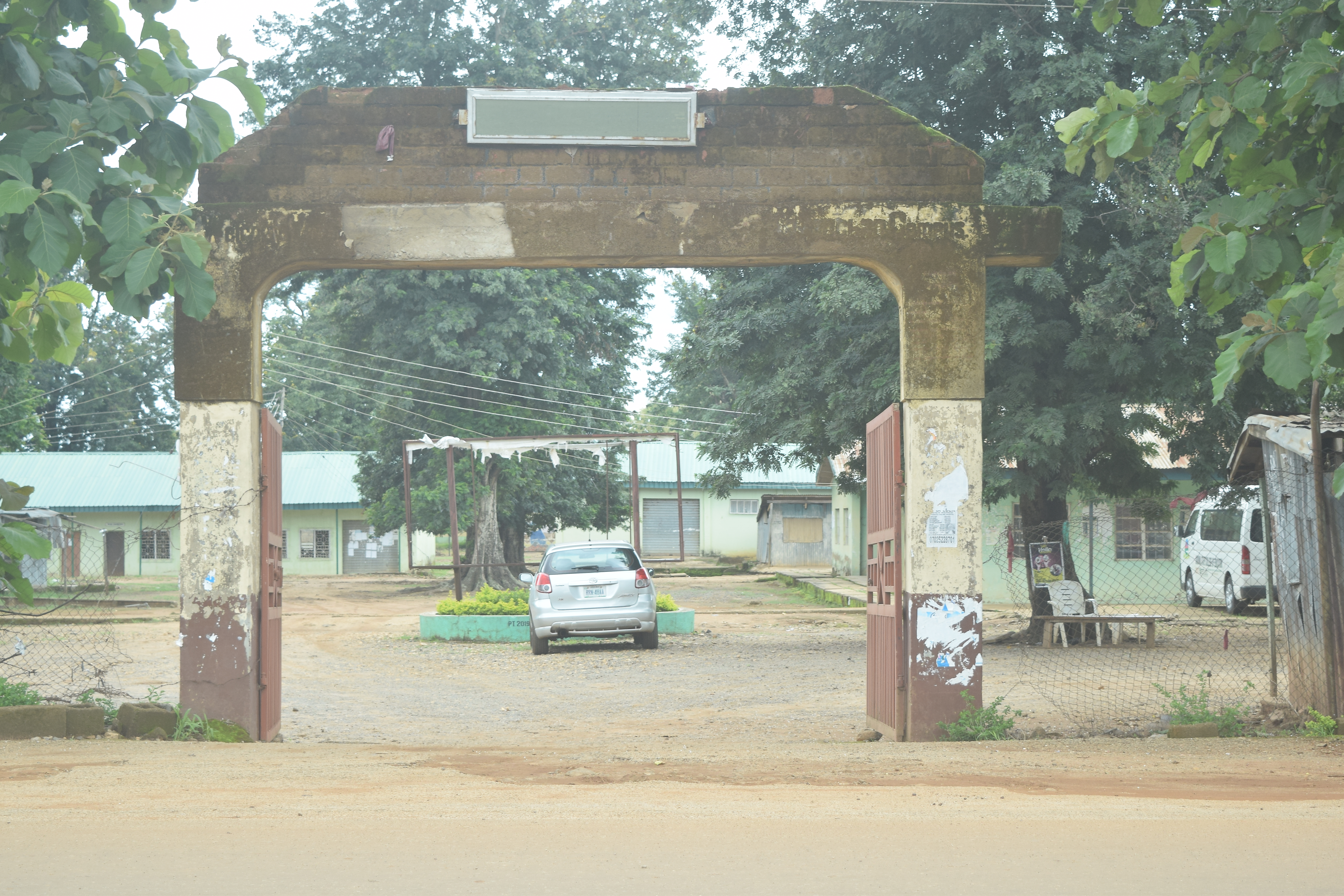
Main entrance KSCOE Garaje Kafanchan

== Courses ==
The institution offers the following courses;

- Christian Religious Studies
- English
- Economics
- Agricultural Science and Education
- Computer Education
- Education and Islamic Studies
- Biology
- Arabic
- Chemistry Education
- French
- Adult and Non-Formal Education
- Hausa
- History
- Early Childhood Care Education
- Physical And Health Education
- Integrated Science
- Geography
- Home Economics and Education
- Business Education
- Theatre Arts and Education
- Fine And Applied Arts
- Special Needs Education
- Primary Education Studies
- Islamic Studies
- Education and Social Studies
- Mathematics Education
- Educational Administration and Planning
- Special Education
- Technical Education
- Guidance and Counseling
- Physical and Health Education

== Alumni ==
- Joe El, Nigerian hip-hop singer
