= Takau District =

Takau Katak-Kakau(-koo)
- District
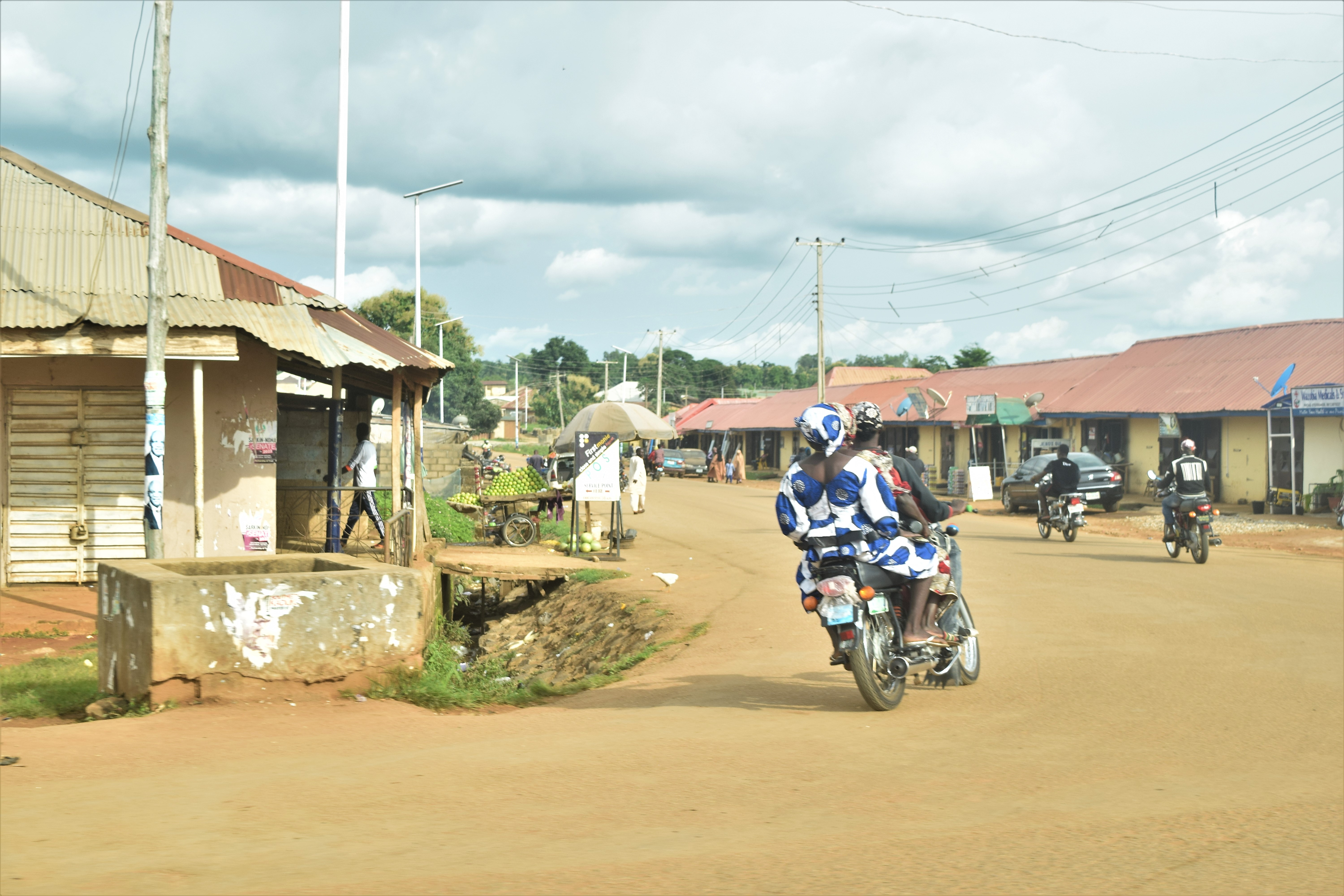
- Takau junction off Kafanchan-Kagoro road

- Location within Nigeria
- Coordinates: 09°34′N 08°18′E
- Country: Nigeria
- State: Kaduna State
- LGA: Jema'a
- Time zone: UTC+01:00 (WAT)
- Postal code: 801139
- Climate: Aw

Takau is a district in Fantswam (Kafanchan) Chiefdom of Jema'a Local Government Area in southern Kaduna state in the Middle Belt region of Nigeria. It is a suburban area of the town of Kafanchan. The postal code of the area is 801139.

== Etymology ==
The word Takau comes from two words in the Fantswam dialect of the Tyap language, ka̠tak ka̠koo, meaning "leeward side of mahogany trees".

== Demographics ==
=== Ethnic composition ===
==== Indigenous people ====
The indigenous people of Takau are the Fantswam people. The district consists of villages occupied by this people.

==== Atyap peoples ====
The Atyap ethnolinguistic group is composed of about eight subgroups of which the Fantswam are a part. Other members of this group with significant populations in the area include: Agworok, Asholyio, Atakad, Atyap and Bajju.

==== Other ethnicities ====
Other peoples found in Takau district include those of Southern Kaduna extract, most notably the Gwong, Ham, Nikyob-Nindem; the Igbo people, most of whom came during the early part of the 20th century after the Kafanchan railway line was completed in 1927. They make up a significant population in the area and live mostly in quarters built for the railway workers.

=== Religion ===
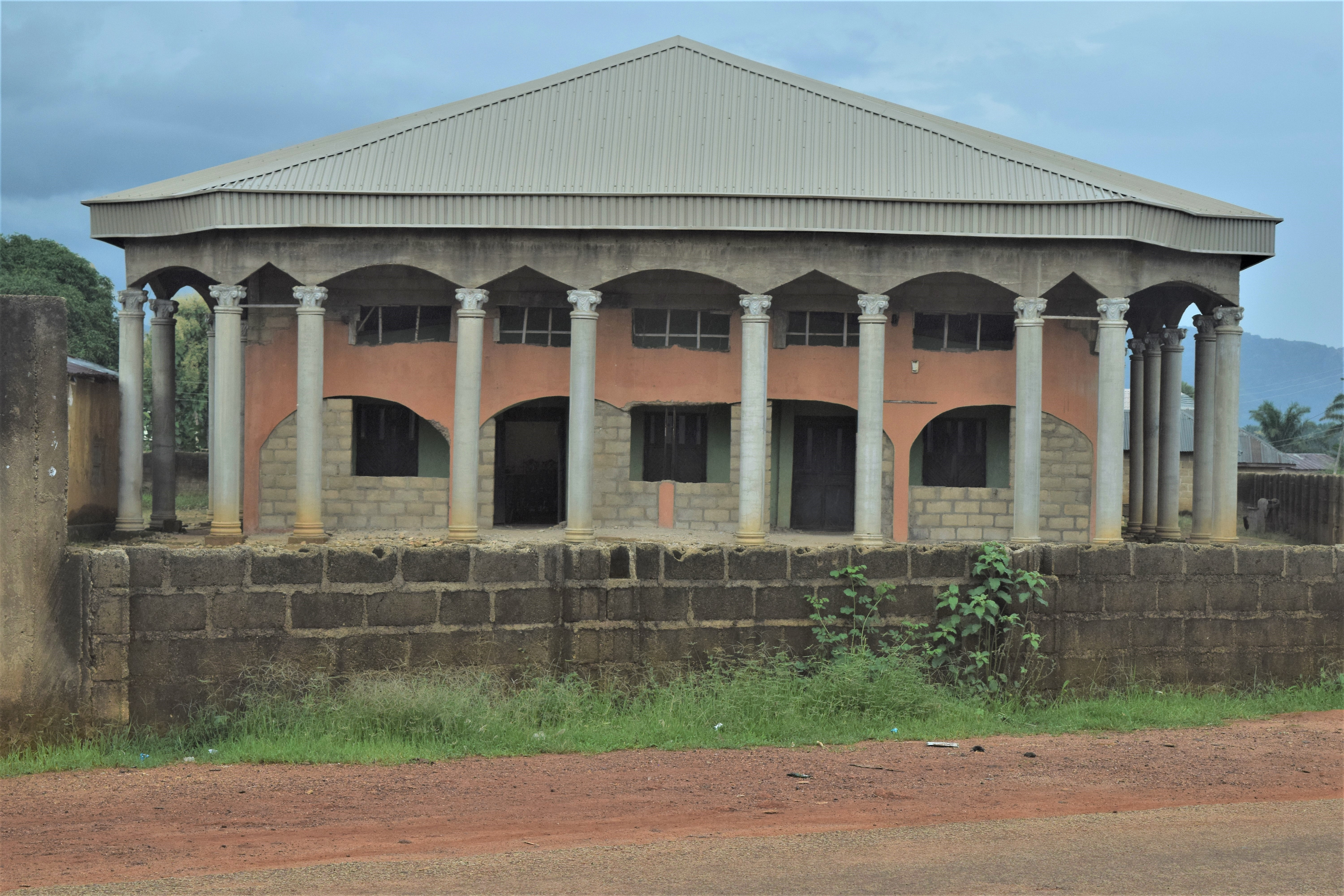
New church building, ECWA 1, Takau, Kafanchan

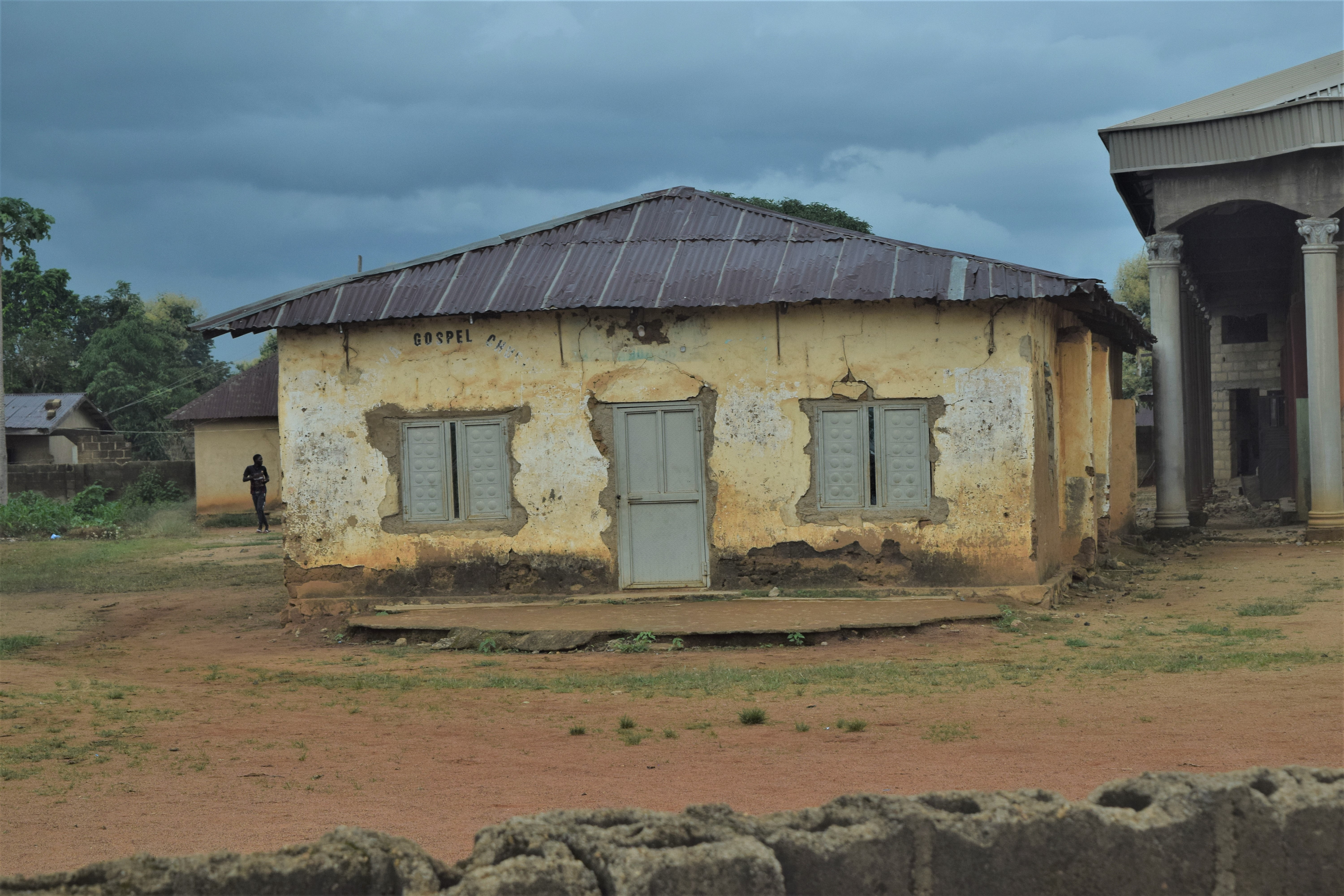
Old church building, ECWA 1 Takau, Kafanchan

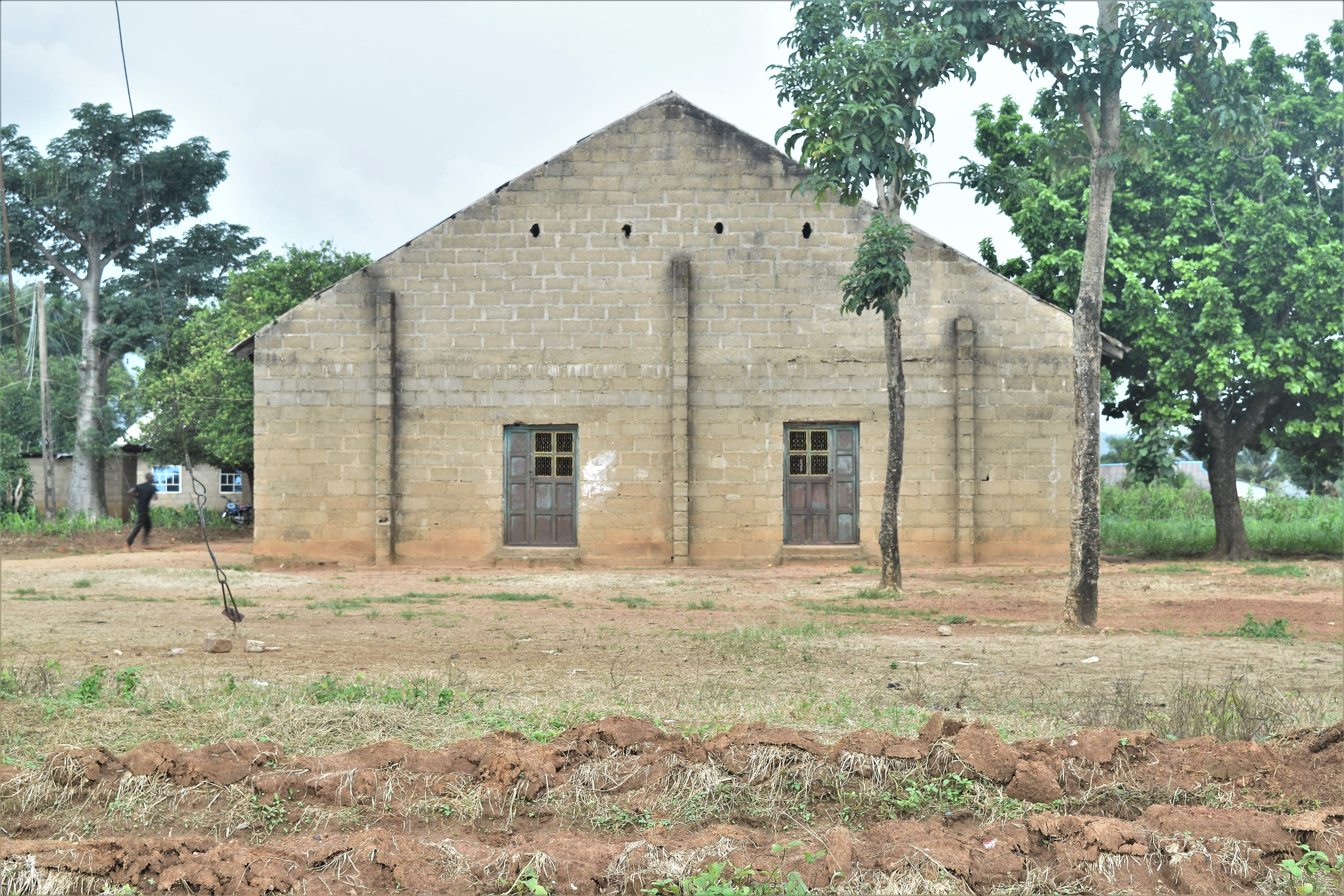
New church building, ECWA 2, Takau, Kafanchan

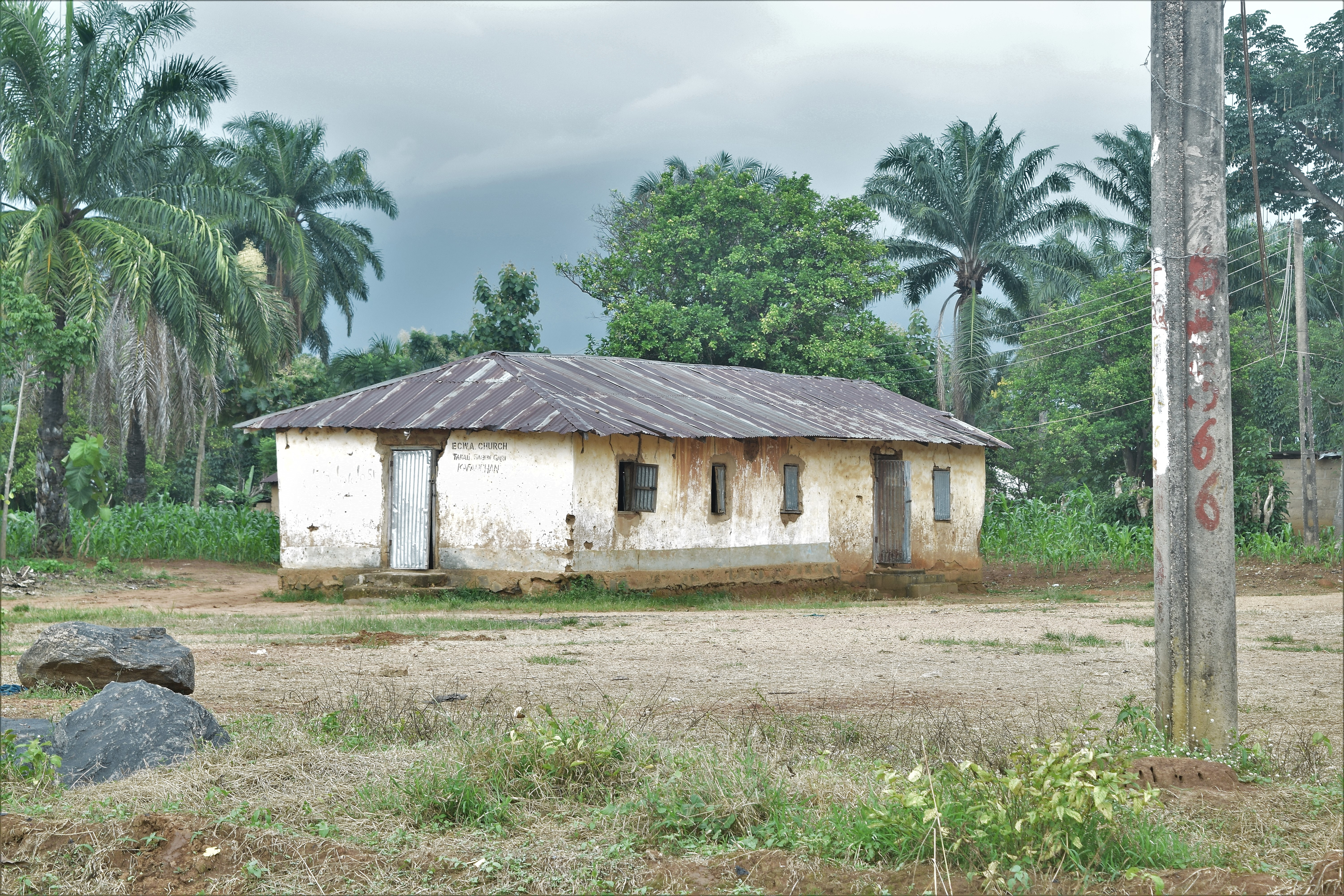
Old church building, ECWA 2, Takau, Kafanchan

The main religion practiced in this area is Christianity. The Protestant denomination is the larger one, especially among indigenous people and Catholicism especially among Igbos. There are a number of churches in Takau, including: ECWA 1, ECWA 2, ECWA Gospel, St. Timothy Catholic church, St. Thomas Catholic church, and others.

== Politics ==
=== Government ===
Takau is led by a District Head, appointed by the Agwam Fantswam (Chief of Kafanchan), who has under him Village Heads and each village head likewise has Ward Heads under his authority.

=== Village units ===
Takau is made up of settlements such as:

1. Baita (also Bainta)
2. Kuka
3. Madaki
4. Maji
5. Sot Rago (H. Ungwa Rago)
6. Sot Shemang (H. Ungwa Shemang)
7. Takau Bunian (also Takau I, Ma-Kanat)
8. Takau Kali (also Zagyong; H. Takau Gida)
9. Takau Takai (also Takau II; Ma-Akau)
10. Yashie (Nyanshyie)

== Education ==
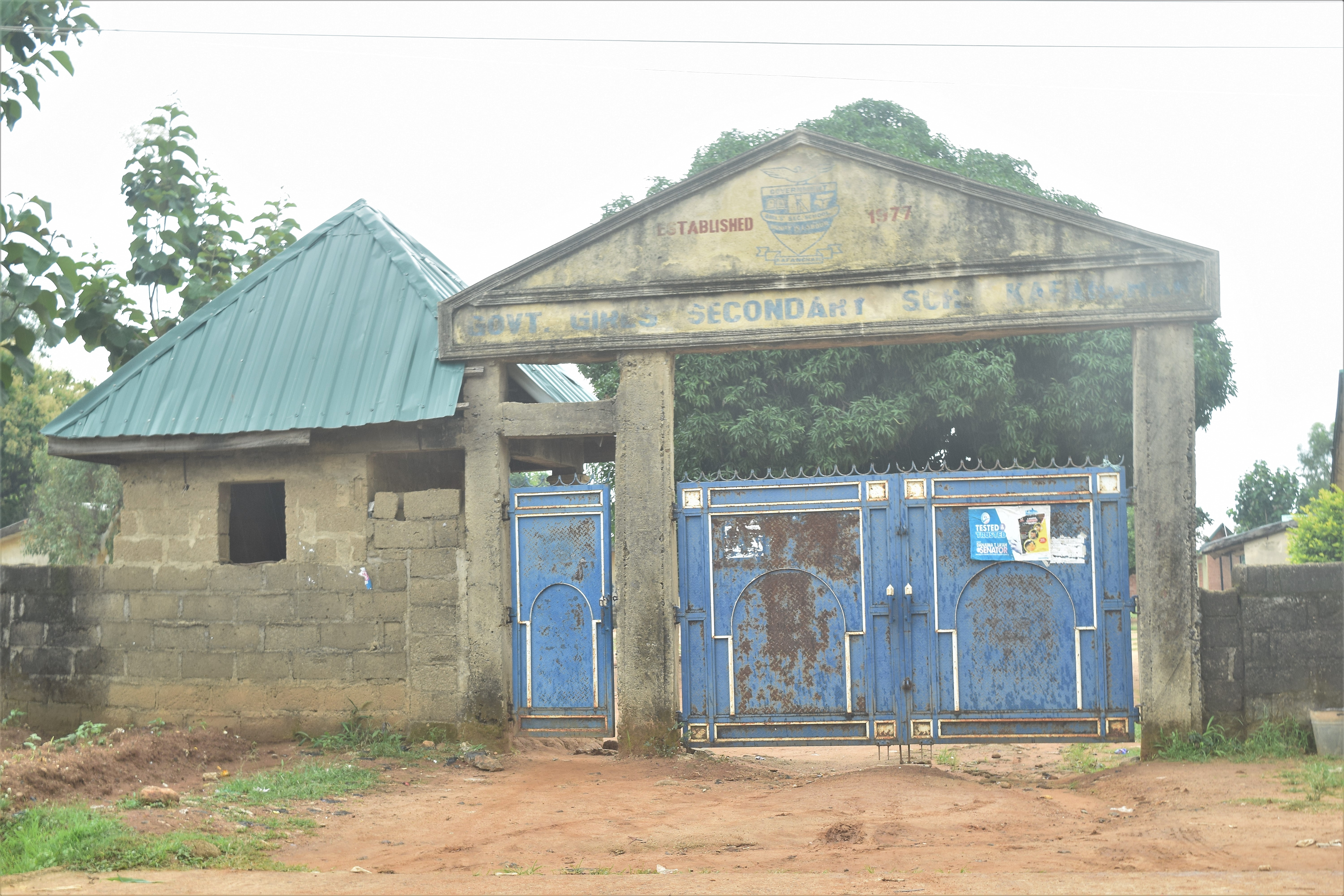
Main entrance, GGSS Kafanchan

The Kafanchan campus of the Kaduna State University is located in Takau. There are also a number of primary and secondary (high) schools such as Government secondary school, Takau, amongst others.

== Economy ==
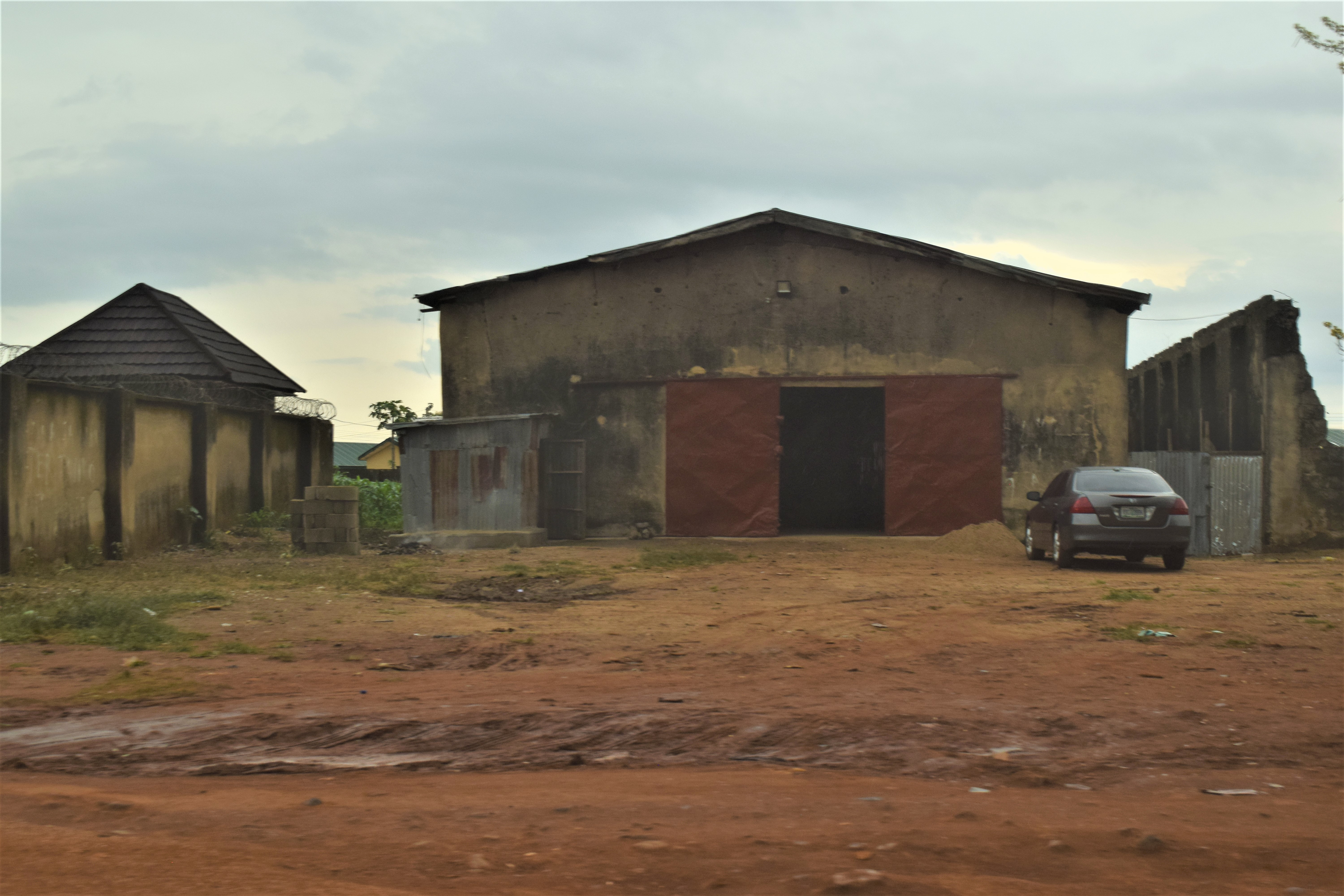
A ginger warehouse

Among the economic activities in Takau are small farm holdings (subsistence farming), ginger processing, metal welding works, block making industry, etc.
