= Gidan Waya =

Gidan Waya Jema'a Daroro
- Town
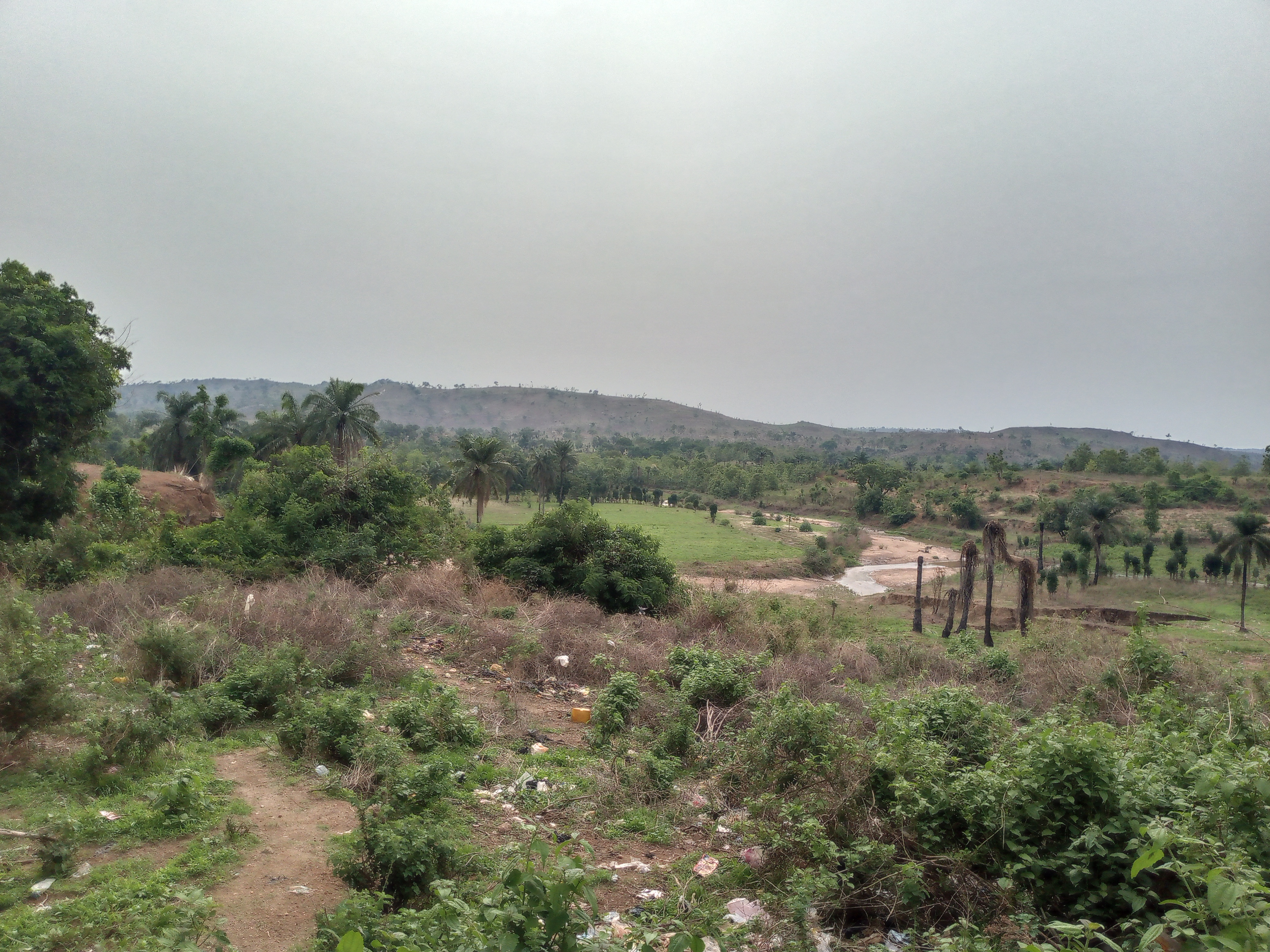
- A hill at Gidan Waya with a small river, "Abwum", flowing towards another, "Kabat", both meeting at a confluence in Godogodo

- Location within Nigeria
- Coordinates: 09°25′N 8°25′E
- Country: Nigeria
- State: Kaduna State
- LGA: Jema'a
- Chiefdom: Godogodo
- Elevation: 896 m (2,940 ft)
- Time zone: UTC+01:00 (WAT)
- Climate: Aw

Gidan Waya is a small town and Headquarters of Godogodo chiefdom about 18 km from Kafanchan in Jema'a Local Government Area of southern Kaduna state in the Middle Belt region of Nigeria. The town has a post office.

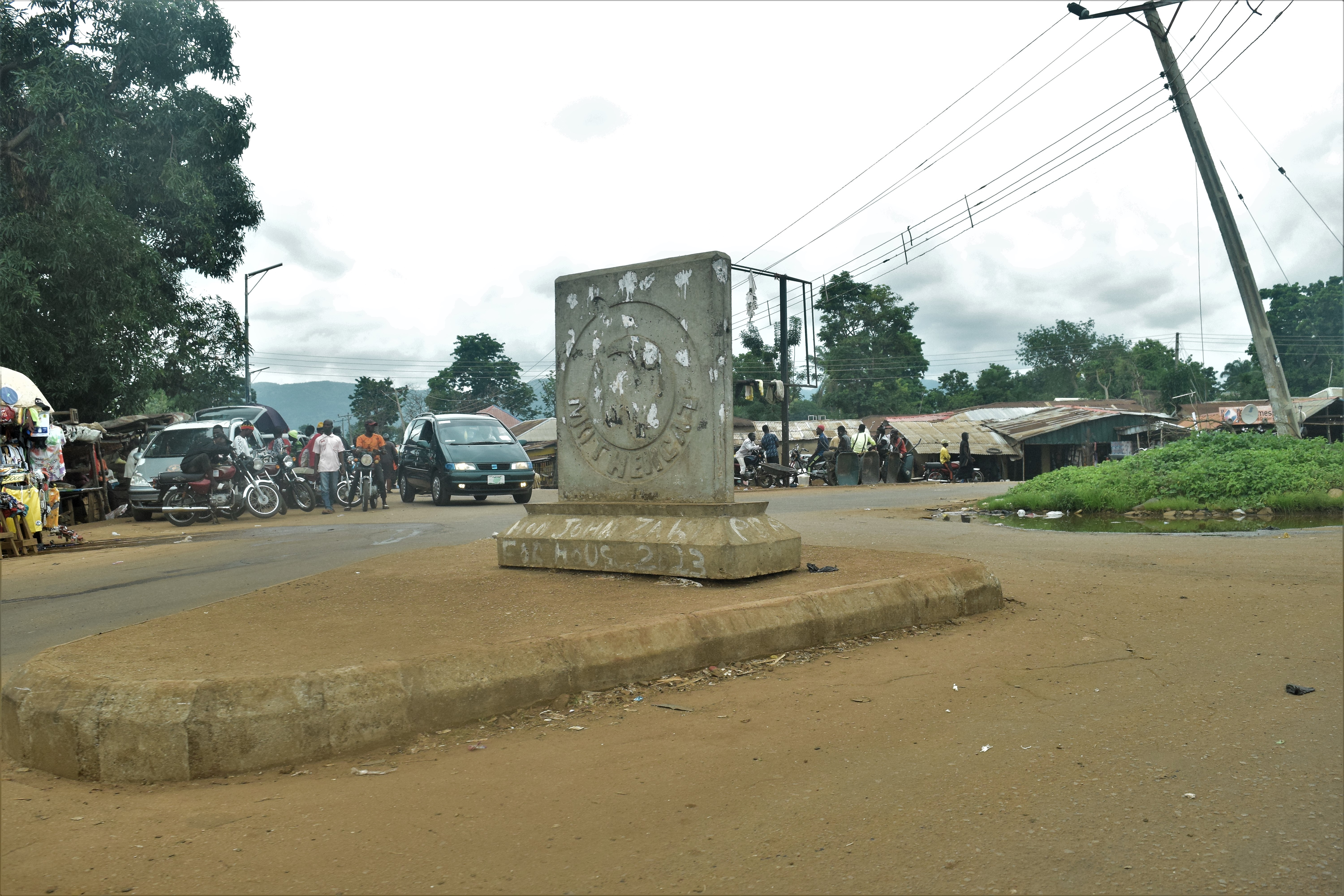
Roundabout, Gidan Waya, Kaduna State, Nigeria

== People and language ==
=== People ===
The people of Gidan Waya are predominantly Tuku and Oegworok by ethnicity. Other groups include: Gwandara, Atakat (Atakad), Nonkyob-Nindem, Ninzam, Ham (also Known as Jaba), Nandu, Tari, Ningon, Atyap, Bajju, etc.

== Education ==
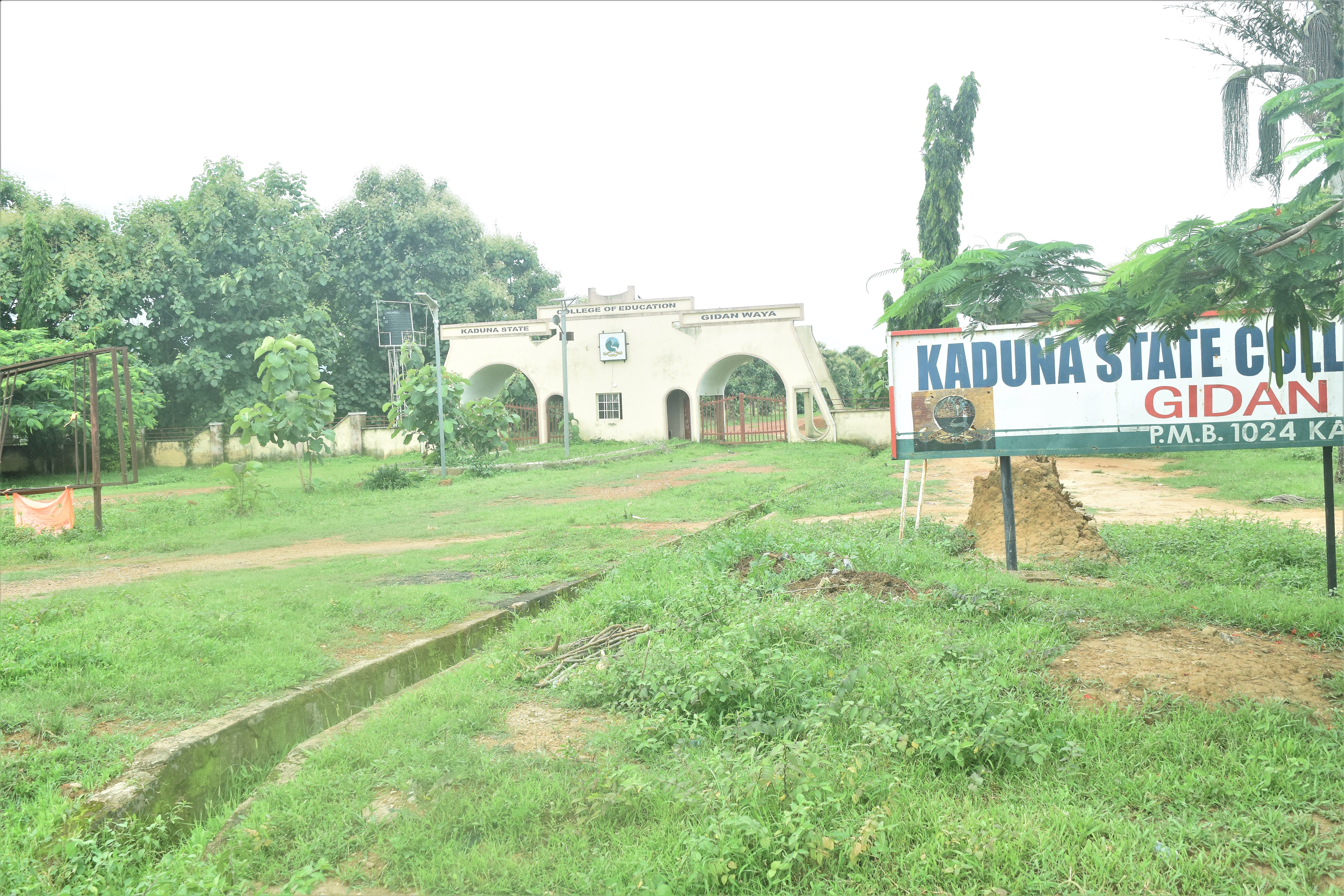
Main entrance and Signpost, KSCOE

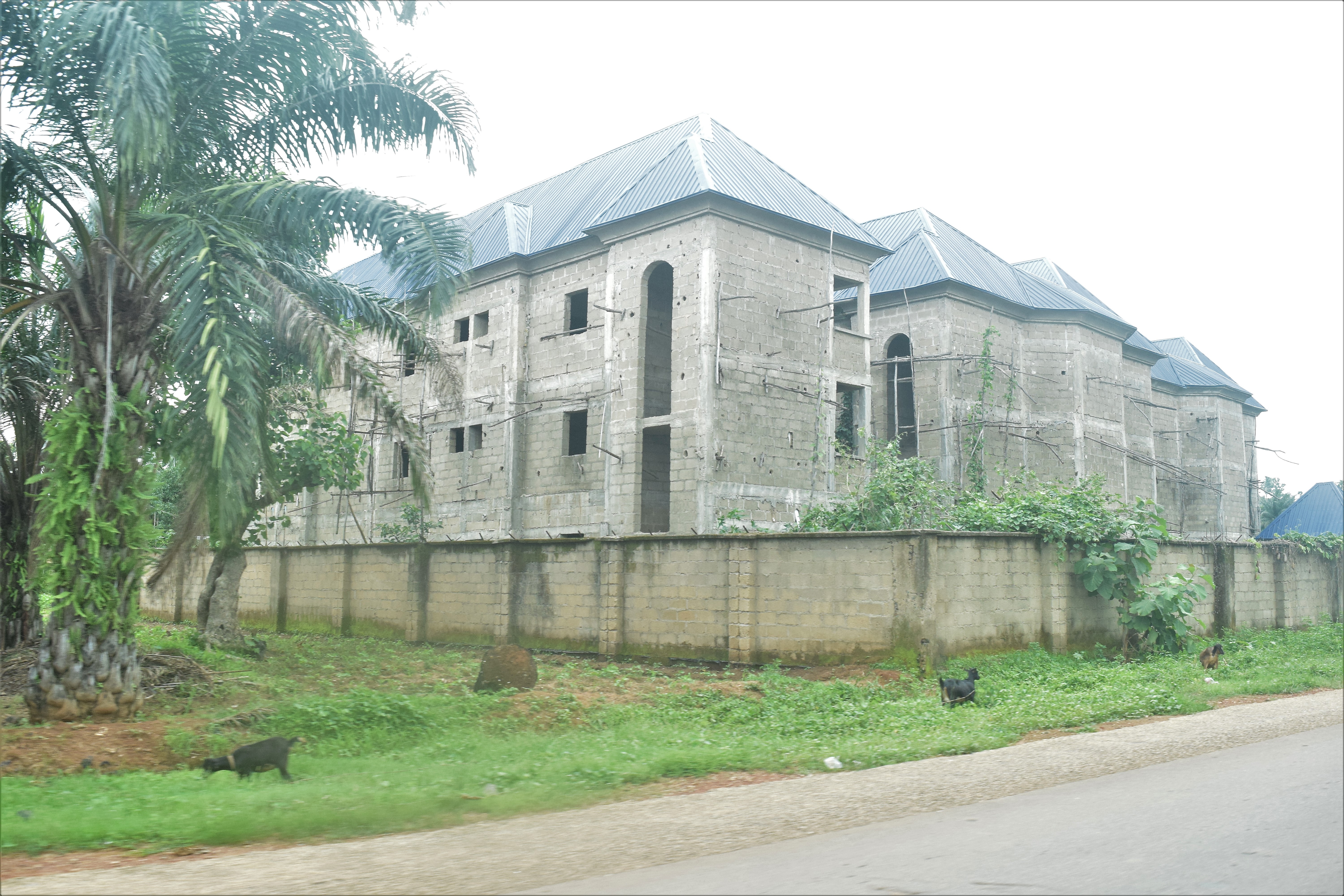
Accommodation structure under construction opposite the KSCOE

The town houses the Kaduna State College of Education (KSCOE)'s permanent site.

== See also ==
- List of villages in Kaduna State
