= Josiah Kantiyok =

Chief of Kafanchan

Josiah Tagwai Kantiyok
- Agwam Fantswam II (officially Agwam Zikpak II)
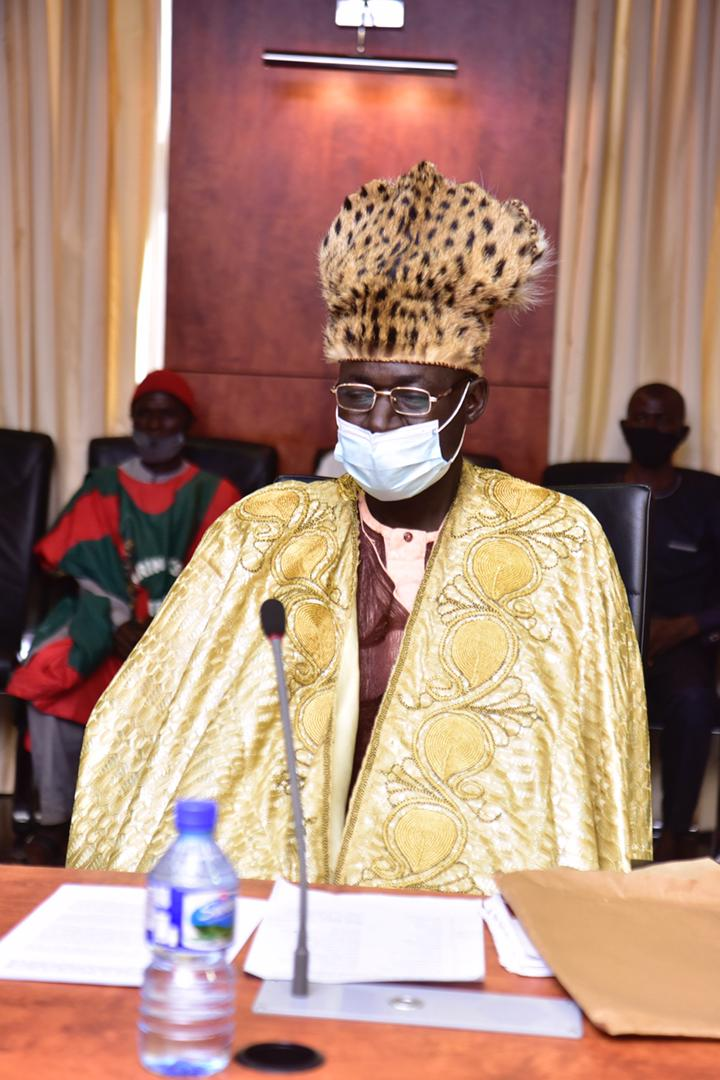
- Josiah Kantiyok, Agwam Fantswam II in 2021

Paramount ruler of Fantswam (Kafanchan) Chiefdom
- In office: 2019 - date
- Coronation: 23 November 2020
- Predecessor: A̠gwam Musa Didam, A̠gwam Fantswam I
- Born: 9 January 1968 (age 58); Fantswam (Kafanchan), North Central State, Nigeria
Names
- English: Josiah Tagwai Kantiyok
- House: Takum
- Religion: Protestantism
- Occupation: Consultant, Civil servant

Styles of Agwam Fantswam II (Agwam Zikpak II)
- Reference style: Highness
- Spoken style: Your Highness
- Alternative style: Tyap: A̱gwam (King)

Dr. Josiah Tagwai Kantiyok (born 9 January 1968) is the second indigenous paramount ruler of Fantswam (Kafanchan) Chiefdom, a Nigerian traditional state in southern Kaduna State of Nigeria. He was crowned as Agwam Zikpak II by the state government although his predecessor was Agwam Fantswam I.

== Early life and education ==
Kantiyok was born in Fantswam (H. Kafanchan), North Central State (now Kaduna State), Nigeria on 9 January 1968.

He attended Army Children School, Bukavo, Kano (1978–1979) and earned a Primary School Leaving Certificate and then proceeded to Government Secondary School, Fadan Kaje, Zonkwa (1981–1984), where he obtained an SC/GEC certificate. He however, on graduation decided to enroll for a pre-degree programme at S.B.S. / Ahmadu Bello University (A.B.U.), Zaria (1984–1986) where he gained an IJMBE certificate, afterwards gaining admission at Ahmadu Bello University, Zaria (1986–1991) where he obtained a D.V.M (Veterinary Medicine) degree. Between 2002 and 2004, he went in for a Post Graduate Diploma programme in Management at the same institution, where he obtained a diploma certificate at the end of the programme, then moved to Abubakar Tafawa Balewa University, Bauchi (2004–2006) where he gained an M.Sc degree in Animal Science (Nutrition). From thence, to Bayero University, Kano (2007–2009) where he obtained an MBA degree in marketing. In furtherance of his education pursuit, he gained admission into the College of Veterinary Surgeons, Nigeria – Fellowship (2012–2015) and obtained an FCVSN certification in Clinical Pharmacology.

Kantiyok also obtained an Associate Chartered Project Manager (ACPM) certificate from the Chartered Project Managers Institute (CPMI) in 2011; a Fellow Chartered Institute of Management Accountants of Nigeria (FCIMAN) certificate from the Chartered Institute of Management Accountants (CIMA) in 2017; and a Fellow National Institute of Marketing of Nigeria certificate from the National Institute of Marketing of Nigeria (NIMN) in 2017.

== Career ==
Kantiyok's working career began in September 1991, after which he obtained the following working experience:

- Farm Veterinarian; Phnomar Nig. Ltd. (Goodwill Poultry Farm), Enugu, Nigeria; September 1991 – August 1992;
- Sales Representative; BIMEDA (Nig.) Ltd., Kano, Nigeria; November 1992 – October 1993;
- Area Sales Representative; Pfizer Products Plc., Lagos, Nigeria; October 1993 – September 1997;
- Mill/Sales Manager – North (last position); Livestock Feeds Plc., Lagos, Nigeria; October 1997 – July 2009;
- Acting Registrar/Chief Executive; Veterinary Council of Nigeria (VCN), Abuja; August 2009 until his call to be the Agwam Fantswam.

In 2018, Kantiyok was quoted by Punch Nigeria while decrying the insufficiency of veterinary doctors in the country saying:

We have registered about 8,600 vet doctors in Nigeria among this figure, just about 30 to 45 percent are engaged in government services...

== Participation in joint projects, programmes and conferences ==
Kantiyok participated in (and of 2020 was still a participant in some of) the following programmes:

- Federal Government of Nigeria Petroleum (Special) Trust Fund, Agric/Food Intervention: 1999–2000;
- Fantswam Foundation (NGO), Providing Micro-Credit to Women and Training Youths in ICT: 2002–2004;
- FAO – FGN National Special Program on Food Security Implementation with K.A.D.P. in Kaduna State: 2003–2007;
- Member, Experts Team, African Union – Interafrican Bureau for Animal Resources (AU – IBAR) Project for Formation/Establishment of African Association of Veterinary Statutory Bodies (2AVSB): 2017–2018;
- Participation in the Pan-African Conference on Veterinary Education, Veterinary Statutory Bodies, Youth and Women Organizations, Cairo, Egypt. 23–27 July 2018;
- Member, Technical Committee on the Review of 2005 Edition of National Drug Policy Document of Nigeria: 2018;
- Member, Nigeria Delegation to OIE General Session of the World Assembly of Delegates, OIE, Paris, France: 2017–present;
- Member, Technical Committee on the Resurgence of Avian Influenza in Nigeria: 2015–present;
- Member, Technical Working Group (TWG) for Formulation and Implementation of National Action Plan for Control of Antimicrobial Resistance (AMR) in Nigeria: 2016–present;
- Member, Technical Working Group for the National Action Plan (NAP) for the Elimination /Control of Rabies in Nigeria by 2030: 2016–present;
- Member, National Laboratory Technical Working Group: 2017–present.
- Member / Representative, Pan-Africa Network For Laboratory Animal Science and Ethics
- Conference Speaker at Asia for Animals, Kuching, Malaysia, 11–14 October 2023. Spoke on: Pan-African Network for Laboratory Animal Science and Ethics (Pan-lase): Building Human Capacity in Research Animal Sciences, Welfare and Ethics Across Africa

== Memberships and awards ==
=== Memberships ===
- Fellow, Nigeria Veterinary Medical Association (NVMA)
- Fellow, Nigeria Institute of Management (MNIM)
- Fellow, National Institute of Marketing of Nigeria (NIMN)
- Fellow, Full Gospel Businessmen Fellowship International (FGBMFI)

=== Awards and honours ===
- Global Citizen Award: 2025
- Best Area Sales Manager Award, for outstanding sales growth: 2007/08. Livestock feeds Plc.
- Second Best Area Sales Manager Award, for Sales/Marketing volume of large animal products: 1997 & 1998.
- Best Area Sales Representative in the North East Area for the Veterinary Medical products Banminth II, Banminth F and Terramycin Soluble powder Award: 1996. Pfizer Product Plc.
- Best Area Sales Representative in the North East Area for the Veterinary Medical Products Banminth II tablet and Terranycin LA inj-solution Award: 1994. Pfizer products Plc.
- Overall outstanding Area Sales Representative in the North-East Area Award: 1994. Pfizer Products Plc.
- Long Service Award by Livestock feeds Plc.
- Certificate of Honour: 1994. Pfizer Products Plc.

== Research papers and publications ==
- Antibacterial Use and Level of Resistance in Poultry: A Retrospective Study in North-Central and South-West Nigeria. Journal of Poultry Science 15 (1) : 13–17, 2018 Print ISSN 1302-3209 – Online ISSN 2147-9003 (www.turkishpoultryscience.com);
- Antimicrobial Resistance in Poultry in Three Selected States of Nigeria. Fellowship Research Project, 2015. Post-graduate College of Veterinary Surgeons, Nigeria, 2012 – 2015;
- A study of the marketing strategies in a commercial feed milling industry. MBA Project, Bayero University Kano, 2009;
- Utilization of rice offal in the diet of Broiler chicken. M.Sc. research project thesis A.T.B.U. Bauchi, 2006;
- Maximization of organizational profitability through efficient management of sales force in the Nigerian environment. Paper presented in the N.I.M., 2005 Young Managers Competition, Abuja. 5 September 2005;
- AVIAN INFLUENZA: A potential threat to poultry production in Nigeria. A review, seminar paper presented at Abubakar Tafawa Balewa University, Bauchi, Nigeria. 27 July 2005;
- Marketing Policy of Livestock Feeds Plc.: Industrial Project Report (PGDM) submitted to Ahmadu Bello University (A.B.U), Zaria, Nigeria. August 2004.
- Prevalence of Toxocara Caris infection in Dogs attending Veterinary Teaching Hospital, A.B.U. Zaria. Final year D.V.M. research project thesis, 1991;
- Public Health Significance of Toxocara Caris Infection in Humans. Published in the Student Veterinarian Journal Volume XV; pp. 30–34, Ahmadu Bello University, Zaria, Nigeria. 1991.

== Enthronement ==
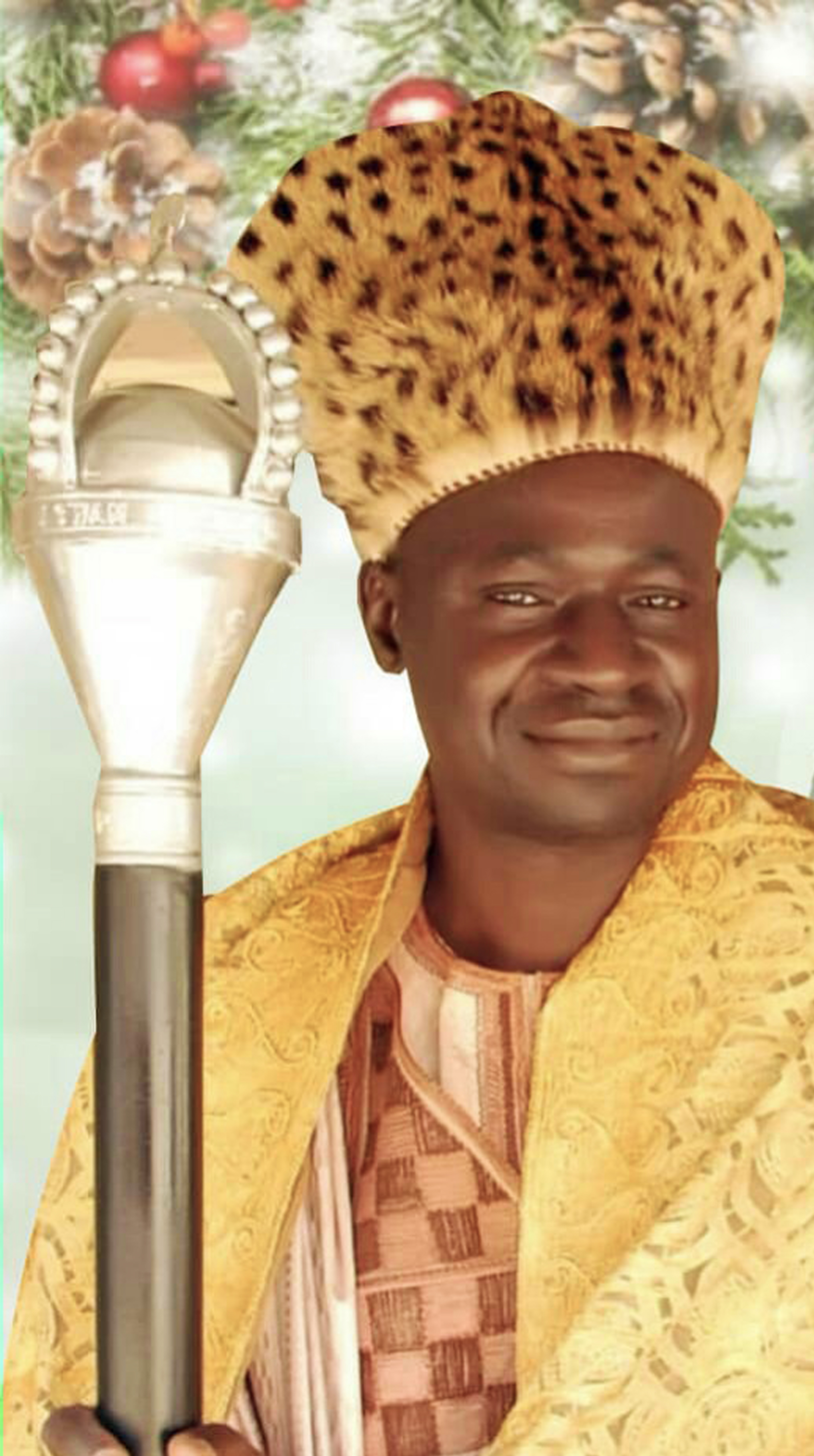
Dr. Kantiyok with staff of office in 2021

Following the demise of Agwam Musa Didam, Agwam Fantswam I, in late 2018, Kantiyok was nominated as a suitable candidate to lead the Fantswam people and other inhabitants of A̱byin Fantswam (Kafanchan), and was appointed to be A̠gwam Fantswam II. However, he was presented the staff of office by the Kaduna State governor as "Agwam Zikpak II" (instead of Agwam Fantswam II) on 23 November 2020.

== Gallery ==
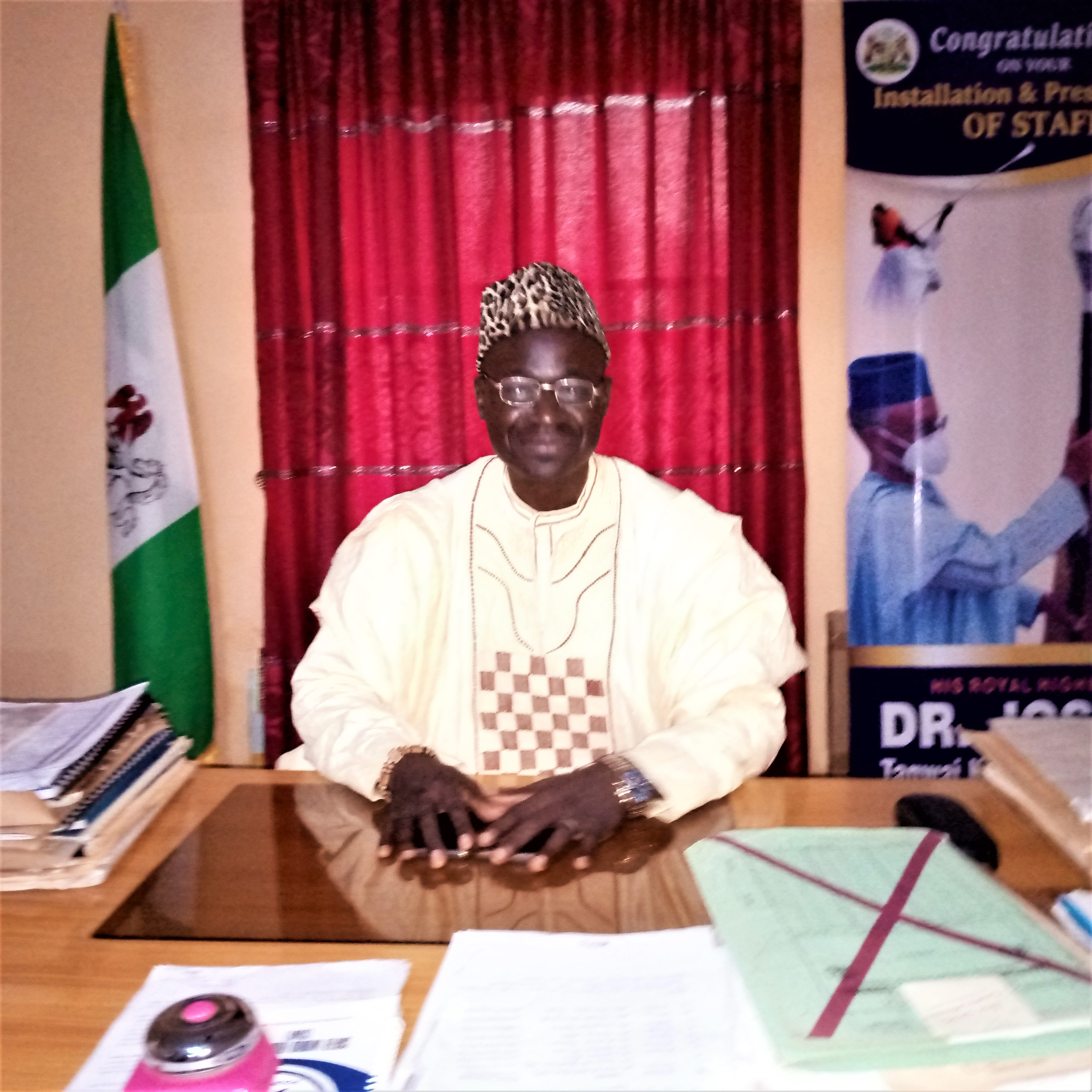

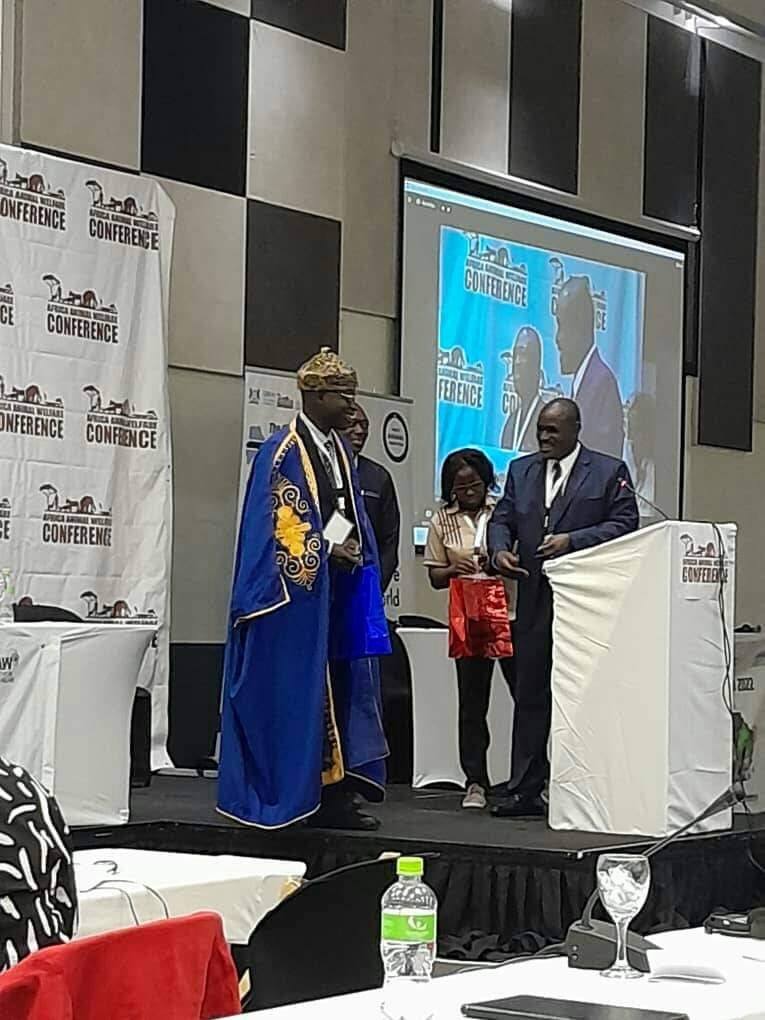

Josiah Kantiyok Takum royal house Born: 9 January 1968
Regnal titles
Preceded by Musa Didam	Agwam Fantswam (also Agwam Zikpak); 2019–present	Succeeded by Yet to be named
