= Musa Didam =

Chief of Kafanchan

Musa Di̠dam
- Agwam Fantswam I

Monarch of Fantswam (Kafanchan) Chiefdom
- In office: 25 January 2001 – 6 November 2018
- Successor: A̠gwam (Dr.) Josiah Kantiyok, A̠gwam Fantswam II

District Head of Fantswam District
- Reign: 1991 – 25 January 2001
- Born: 14 April 1933; Chen, Zikpak, Fantswam (Kafanchan), Northern Region, British Nigeria
- Died: 6 November 2018 (aged 85); Zikpak, Fantswam, Kaduna State, Nigeria
- Burial: Zikpak, Fantswam, Kaduna State, Nigeria
- Spouse: Akamai Didam (née Atyong) (m. 1954; died 2020)
- Issue: Hauwa; Lydia; Victor; Angela; Simon; Usman; Serah; Gin; Tuman; Jang
Names
- English: Musa Didam; Fantswam (Tyap): Musa Di̱dam
- House: Zikpak
- Father: Didam Dadyi
- Mother: Ndwan Kuhyeb
- Religion: Evangelical Christianity
- Occupation: Mathematician, Educationist

Styles of Agwam Fantswam I
- Reference style: His Royal Highness
- Spoken style: Your Royal Highness
- Alternative style: Tyap: A̱gwam (King)

Musa Didam (14 April 1933 – 6 November 2018) was a former District Head of the Fantswam (Kafanchan Kewaye) District, then in the Jama'a Emirate and later the first indigenous monarch of Fantswam (Kafanchan) Chiefdom, a Nigerian traditional state in southern Kaduna State, Nigeria. He was also known by the titles "Mallam Musa Didam," "Mr. Musa Didam" and "Agwam Fantswam I."

== Early life and education ==
HRH Agwam Musa Didam was born in Chen (H. Kurmi), Zikpak, Fantswam (Kafanchan), in the defunct Northern Region, British Nigeria (now Fantswam (Kafanchan), southern Kaduna State, Nigeria, on 14 April 1933. His father, Didam Dadyi was a farmer and his mother, Ndwan Kuhyeb a housewife.

Young Didam's educational pursuit began at the then Sudan Interior Mission (SIM), in Fantswam (Kafanchan) whereafter he proceeded to Sudan Interior Mission (SIM), Gworok (Kagoro), to complete his primary education. Following much encouragement by his father, on completion of his primary school education he advanced to Katsina College for his Grade III and II Courses between 1958 – 1964. Among his peers who attended the college with him were Mr. Micah Kalat, Col. Iliya Baba (late) and Mallam Abubakar Sanga.

== Career ==
Didam began a career in education as a teacher, rising to become the headmaster of Primary School, Ancha then later on, Primary School, Watyap (Kaura) where he left landmarks.

Being in love with education, he advanced further and acquired a National Certificate of Education at the College of Education and was among the pioneering students of the All Teachers College (ATC), Kafanchan. He then advanced to Ahmadu Bello University (ABU), Zaria where he obtained a B.Ed. in Mathematics.

As a sportsman, he became the football and hockey captain of that very institution.

== Family life ==
Didam married Miss Akamai Atyong whom he met while at Gworok (Kagoro) in 1954. The couple had ten children namely: Hauwa, Lydia, Victor, Angela, Simon, Usman, Serah, Gin, Tuman and Jang. Being a loving and caring father, he endured that his children were well educated. He was as well at the time of his burial, blessed with 22 grandchildren and nine great-grandchildren.

== Faith life ==
Didam accepted the Lord Jesus Christ as his personal saviour and got baptized in 1964. Growing in spiritual life, he became a member of the Boys' Brigade and the Scouts and also a keen participant in their activities. He was also a member of the church men's fellowship and helped in growing the church, for he was brave, courageous and served God and man with his entire heart.

== Leadership roles ==
Didam was a leader among both peers and younger ones of his and participated in community development such as road and bridge constructions linking several villages around, and was always a leadsman. He loved to participate also in meetings aimed at developing the Fantswam community.

These and more led to his selection amidst many others to be the first Fantswam District Head when the new district was created in 1991. His reign was marked by his listenership quantities where he gave ears to all regardless of ethnic or religious leanings.

After the request by him and other Fantswam sons and daughters for the creation of a Fantswam Chiefdom and the creation of it by the then governor of Kaduna State, Ahmed Makarfi, he was made the first Agwam Fantswam (Kafanchan) on 25 January 2001. Six additional districts were created to make seven for the chiefdom to ease administration and foster rapid development during his reign.

== Ailment and death ==
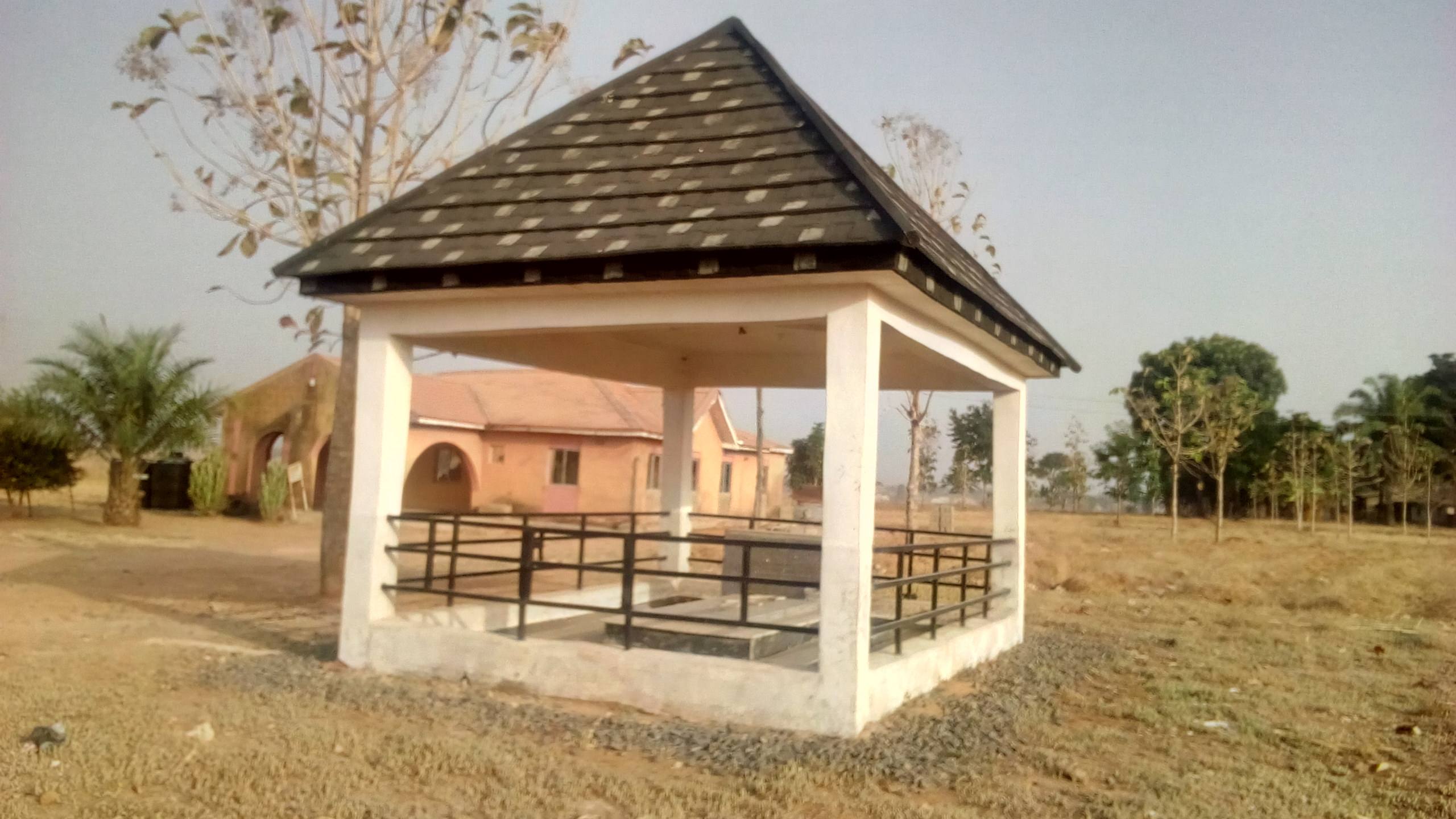
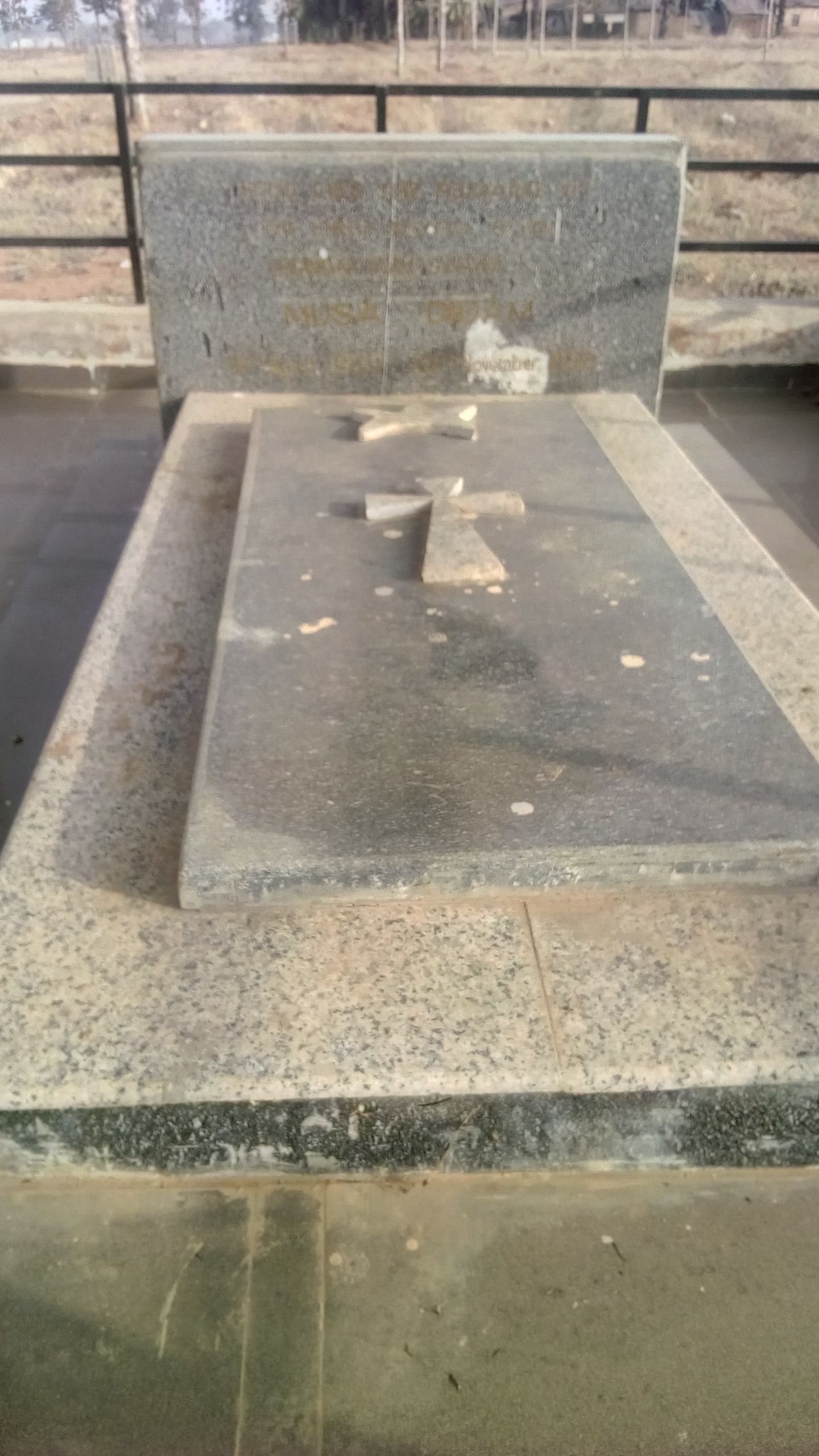
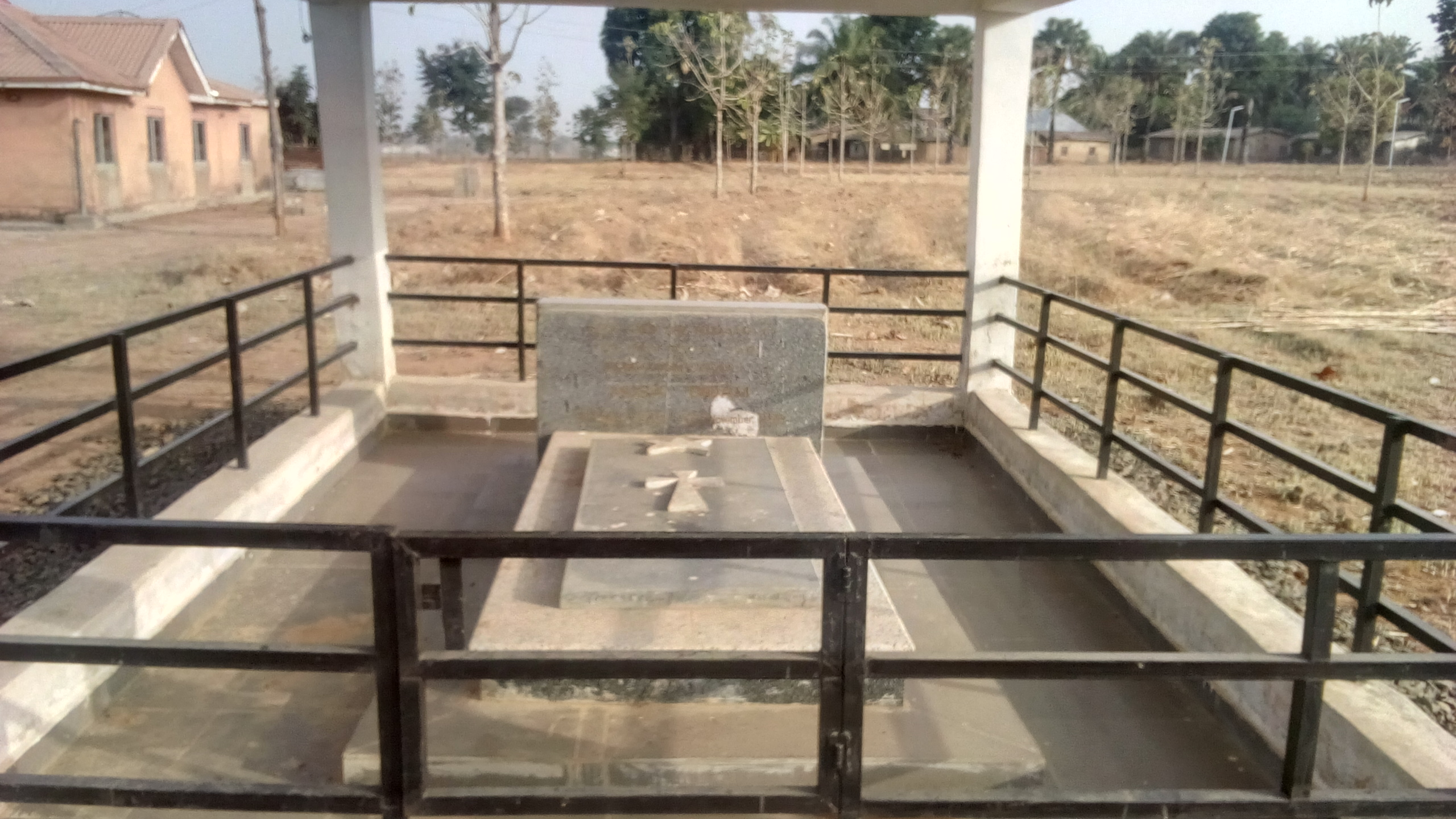
^{Resting place of Agwam Musa Didam, Zikpak, Kafanchan}

Didam suffered from diabetes and hypertension for many years, and after 17 years as Agwam Fantswam I, he died on 6 November 2018, at the age of 85. He was buried at his home in Zikpak, Fantswam (Kafanchan) on Friday 9 November 2018.

== Wife's murder ==
It was reported by several news media that Fulani herdsmen invaded his home on 25 July 2020 killing his wife, his brother (father to the Nigerian musical artiste, Joe El), burning down the house in the process.

Musa Didam Zikpak royal house Born: 14 April 1933 Died: 6 November 2018
Regnal titles
Preceded by Title established	Agwam Fantswam; 2001–2018	Succeeded by Josiah Kantiyok
