= Godogodo =

Town in southern Kaduna

- Town
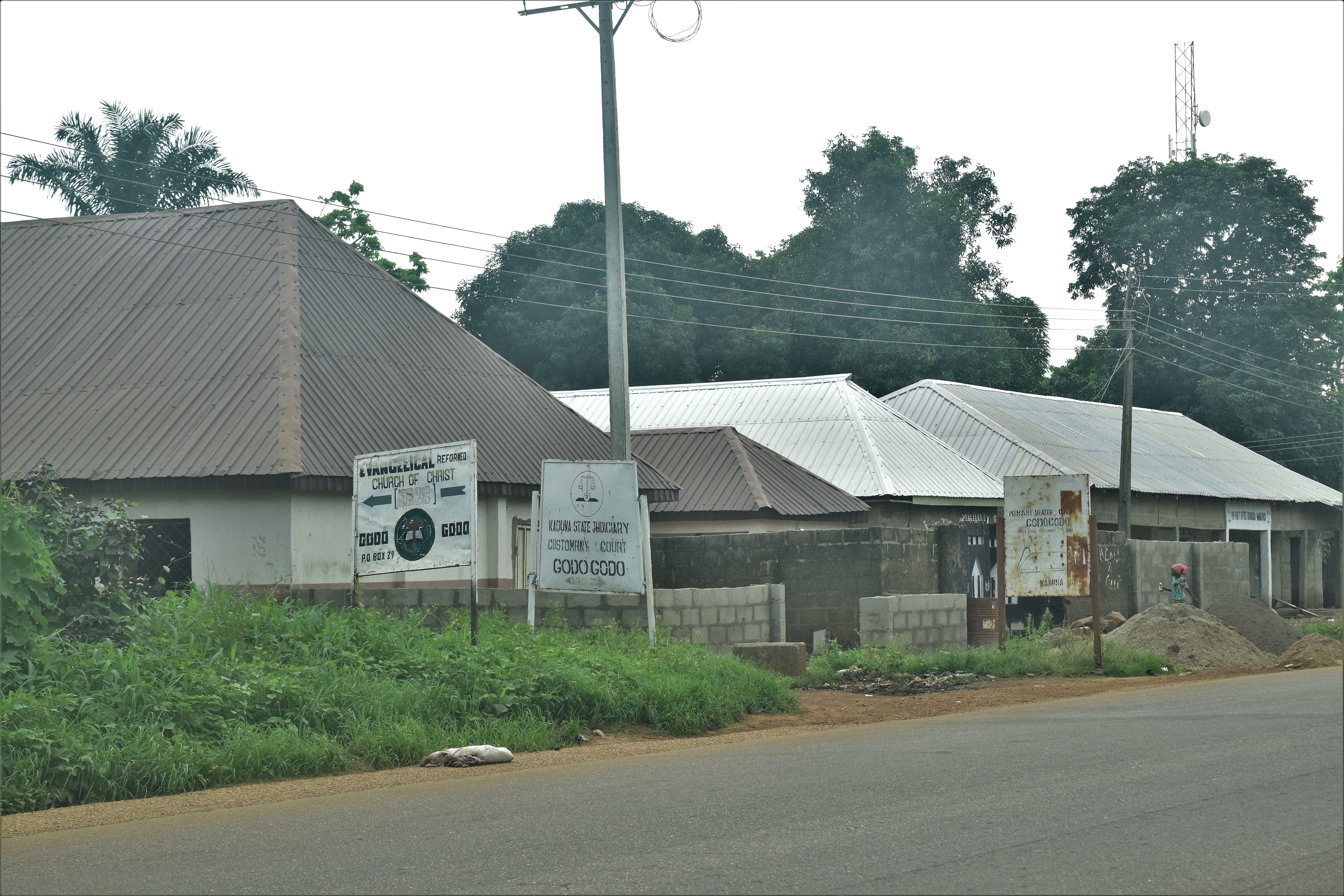
- Signpost, Customary Court

- Location within Nigeria
- Coordinates: 09°26′N 08°21′E
- Country: Nigeria
- State: Kaduna State
- LGA: Jema'a
- Time zone: UTC+01:00 (WAT)
- Postal code: 801
- Climate: Aw

Godogodo is a district as well as a town in Jema'a Local Government Area in southern Kaduna state in the North-Central Region region of Nigeria. It is also the Godogodo Chiefdom headquarters (of the Nindem, Hausa, Fulani and Ninzo people). The town has a post office, with a postal code 801103 . It also houses an old tin mining tunnel site located along the town, one of the oldest tin mining site is known as (Dan Kurciya).
