= Ninkyob-Nindem language =

Plateau language spoken in Nigeria

Ninkyob-Nindem
- Kaningkom-Nindem
- Native to: Nigeria
- Native speakers: 12,000 (2008)
- Language family: Niger–Congo?: Atlantic–Congo; Benue–Congo; Plateau; Ninzic; Ninkyob-Nindem
- Dialects: Ninkyob (Kaningkom); Nindem (Minden, Ninjang, Nindang)

Language codes
- ISO 639-3: kdp
- Glottolog: kani1277

Ninkyob-Nindem (Kaningkom-Nindem) is a dialect cluster of Plateau languages in Nigeria.
