= List of villages in Kaduna State =

Villages in Kaduna State, Nigeria

This is a list of villages and settlements in Kaduna State, Nigeria organised by local government area (LGA) and district/area (with postal codes also given).

== By postal code ==
LGA	District / Area	Postal code	Villages
Birnin Gwari	Birnin Gwari	800108	Dangaladima; Danhadau; Galadima; Shittu; Tudun Jega; Bagom; Birnin Gwari; Goron Dutse; Kagi; Kwaga; Mando; Ung. Katuka
Birnin Gwari	Dogon Dawa	800115	Cikin Garin D/Dawa; Dogo Dawa; Funtuwan Badade; Laca; Ung. Danko
Birnin Gwari	Gayam	800119	Bugai; Dagara; Fari; Gayam; Kaguru; Kamfanin Doko; Layin Maigwari; Muya; Rumanan Hause
Birnin Gwari	Kakangi	800111	Gauji; Ishiwai; Kakangi; Kanoma; Kisaya; Kubau; Kurgi; Ukinkina
Birnin Gwari	Kazage	800113	Gelobai; Gwanda; Ingade; Kazage; Takama; Unguwar Dankande
Birnin Gwari	Kungi	800112	Dawakin Bassa; Imagu; Kuki; Kungi; Loko; Nasarawa; Unguwar Baduku; Unguwar Madaki
Birnin Gwari	Kutemeshi	800117	Kanawa; Kutemeshi; Kwashi; Raku; Unguwar Chindo; Unguwar Gajere
Birnin Gwari	Kuyello	800110	Dunya; Kuyello; Kwadaga; Kwasa-kwasa; Old Kuyello; Shado; Yankan Dutse
Birnin Gwari	Maganda	800118	Dodo; Maganda; Old Birnin Gwari
Birnin Gwari	Randagi	800109	Ijinga; Karauchi; Kimbi; Kunun Gayya; Randagi; Shirya; Ukuga
Birnin Gwari	Saulawa	800114	Jan Birni; Old Saulawa; Saulawa; Sofa; Unguwar Nacibi
Birnin Gwari	Tabanni	800116	Dokan Ruwa; Kamfanin Mamman; Kwala-kwangi; Layin Lassan; Tabanni; Yarwa
Chikun	Chikun	800104	Bagado; Chikun; Doga-Maijama; Gayan; Kakau; Kashebo; Kotarma; Mafoina; Matari Kujama; Mai Jama'A; Narayi; Rido; Sabon-Tasha; Sabon-Yelwa; Tsaunin Kura; Unguwar Sunday;
Chikun	Gwagwada	800107	Buruku; Chikun; Gadani; Gwagwada; Kasaya; Katarma; Kugo; Kunai; Kuriga; Nassarawa
Giwa	Fatika	810104	Danhauya; Fatika; Gadagau; Galadimawa; Idasu; Iyatawa; Kadage; Karau Karau; Kaya; Kidandan; Kundu; Murai; Rafin Yashi; Ruku; Wazata; Yakawada
Giwa	Giwa/Shika	810105	Danmahawayi; Diyo; Gangara; Giwa Sabuwa; Guga; Kakangi; Kuringa; Madara; Maje; Makwaye; Mujedawa; Panhauya; Shika; Tsibiri; Yalwa
Igabi	Igabi	800101	Amaza; Audi; Bargu; Dunki; Dusten Mai; Eadan Gayon; Faro Kwai; Garda; Gehehu; Igabi; Kerawa; Mangi; Pumbi Ditse; Turunku; Yalwa; Zangon Aya
Igabi	Riga-Chikun	800102	Bikaratu; Birnin Yero; Gadan-Gayan; Girku; Gwaraji; Jaji; Kabam; Kabubuwa; Kangimi; Kashirmi; Kurmin Kaduna; Kwarau; Labara; Morarraban Jos; Nagwari; Panshanu; Rigachikun; Rihogi; Rikota; Rubu
Igabi	Rigasa	800103	Afaka; Birain-Daji; Dunki; Harawa; Ifire; Kudandan; Kwate; Mashjigwari; Rigasa; Riyawa; Sabon-T Wada; Tami; Wasana
Ikara	Ikara	812101	Auchan; Chara; Dan-Lawal; Furana; Ikara; Janfalan; Jibis; Kankanki; Kurmin Jau; Kurmin Kogi; Kwari; Makurdi; Malilanchi; Pala; Saulawa; Saya-Saya
Ikara	Paki	812102	Allab-Gaba; Baulawa; Buchan; Bunji; Kakau; Kuya; Kwari; Paki; Rinji; Romi; Vauran; Yalwa Deji; Yauran
Jaba	Ankung	801111	Ankung; Duyyah; Fai; Sambam
Jaba	Kwoi	801109	Bitaro; Dura; Kwoi; Kyan; Sabchem; Sabzuro
Jaba	Nok/New Nok	801110	Chori; Daddu; Nok; Sabon Gari; U.Galadima
Jema'a	Amere	801142	Amere; Garti; Garti Station; Ung. Fulani; Ung. Jaba
Jema'a	Anguwar Fari	801102	Alkali; Dakaci; Jeh; Shok I; Small London; Ubandoma; Ungwa Fari; Ungwa Pakachi
Jema'a	Atuku	801151	Lassang; Tantsock; Tufin Tsock; Kumpamp; Manyi Kupi; Tuku Gada;Baidi; sakiyo; utsak; Tafan Gida; Manyi gyara
Jema'a	Bakin Kogi	801143	Baraki; Doka; Garwa; Gongola; Kyau; Nbiatut; Tasha; Tum; Ungwa Pah; Yanga
Jema'a	Bedde	801149	Azar; Gatai; Hagbon; Injebi; Mabin; Ngaada; Ramindop; Urkura
Jema'a	Dangoma	801140	Bornanken; Fulani; Kafiya; Kaso; Koccel; Nadyry; S.Gari Wunti; Sallabe; Wunti
Jema'a	Gidan Waya	801147	Antang; Baiya; Dogon Filin; Gidan Waya; Hayi Gada; Kiban; Nisama; Pasa Kwari; Tafan Gidan; Ung. Mada Nisamo; Ung. Nungu
Jema'a	Godogodo	801103	Idu Ungwan Anjo; Akwa; Kibam; Kampa, Gada Biyu; Ninte Madaki; Ninte Sarki; Ninte Andaha; Fari Hawa Sarki; Farin Hawa Somi; Godo-Godo; Golkofa; Manteh; Zankan-Nindem I; Zankan-Nindem II; Nindem kogo; Tudun Wada; Arusuwa; Anguwan Makera; Anguwan Faa.
Jema'a	Jagindi	801145	Bakut; Banaje; Dalle; Jagindi Tasha; Lariyo; Marmarare; Marwa; Pah; Ung. Kagoma
Jema'a	Jagindi Tasha	801146	Araga; Dangwa; Dogon Awo; Fafinta; Jagindi Tasha; Janda; Kogum Dutse; Kogum Gindin Dutse; Kogum Tasha; Koho; Kpgi, Tsakiya; Madaki; Mile one; Pah Kogum; Rafin Dadi; Ug. Patake; Ung. Magaji; Ung. Mangoro; Ung. Ninzam Tasha; Ung. Ninzam Kogum
Jema'a	Zibin	801138	Katak Nien; Katak Nzuu; Maigida; Nzuu; Takai; Ungwa Masara (Katak Atyap); Ungwa Musa Kognet
Jema'a	Kagoma/Asso	801104	Afana Daji; Afana Kagoma; Afana Kaje; Balciyam; Fadan Kagoma 'A'; Fadan Kagoma 'B'; Fadan Kagoma 'C'; Fadan Kagoma 'D'; Fulani; Gado 'A'; Hausa; Ibo; Iggah; Jibrin 'A' & 'B'; Ngakyozi; Nhesu; Toro; Ung. Kwasau; Wyellah
Jema'a	Kara	801150	Dundu; Faugala; Gombe; Gyosagon; Hagbon; Kara; Kpeme; Talani
Jema'a	Kpadam	801148	Fa-nock; Gabi; Ghauta; Gigira; Kanok; Kayaya; Kitti; Kularaba
Jema'a	Manyii	801136	Audi; Aduwan 1-5; Galadima; Katak Mamang; Ma'adam; Manyii; Musa Aluwong; Quarters; Railway Station &; Tanko; Ungwa Maigizoh; Ungwa Waziri
Jema'a	Tsonje	801144	Alkali Goska; Ambam; Ambere North; Farin Dadi; Galadima Goska; Goska; Tsonje; Tudun Wada I; Ung. Motty Amban; Ung. Samuda; Wada II
Jema'a	Takau	801139	Baita; Kuka; Madaki; Maji; Takau Bunian; Takau Kali (Takau Gida); Takau Takai; Ungwa Rago; Ungwa Shemang; Yanshyi
Jema'a	Unguwar Baki	801141	Baduku; Jeh II; Jumrau; Majidadi; Nko; Sabo Gari; Sarki Pada; Station; Station Baki; Ung. Rana; Unguwar Baki; Unguwar Baye; Unguwar G.S.S.; Unguwar Madaki
Jema'a	Zikpak	801139	Bayan Loco; Habu; Markus; Ugwa Awodi; Zakhwo; Zikpak Fada
Kachia	Ankwa	802156	Ankwa; Ankwa Kudu; Gora; Maid Iddo; Parci
Kachia	Awon	802157	Akwana; Akwando; Anturu; Awon
Kachia	Bishini	802102	A&B; Ariko; Badoko; Bishini; Daddu; Ingili; K/Iya; Kateri; Kurutu
Kachia	Doka	802118	Akilibu; Anfu; Doka; Rigana
Kachia	Kachia	802101	Adage; Jodu; Kachia; Sakwai
Kachia	Kurmin Mazuga	802155	Dabarga; Gumel; Kurmin baba; Mafoa Fadia
Kachia	Sabon Sarki	802117	Cyani; Gidan Mana; Gidan Tagwai; Jaban Kogo; Kurin Musa; Kwaturu; Sabon Sarki
Kagarko	Akote	802113	Akote; Kasangwai; Kurmin Kira; Pa Baki
Kagarko	Chakwama	802115	Chakwama; Chama; Kpechi; Kwaliko; Tunga
Kagarko	Dogon Kurmin	802111	Dogon Kurmi; Kasabere; Kusam
Kagarko	Iddah	802114	Gami; Iddah; Mape; Tafa Gari
Kagarko	Janjala	802112	Gidan Makeri; Ido; Janjala; Kohuto; Kuku; Taka Lafiya
Kagarko	Jere	802105	Bakuchi; Chinka; Dlmale; G/Jibo; Gujeni; Jere; Kpakulu; Kwasare; Pmana
Kagarko	Kagarko	802104	Dogon Daji; Kadanyu; Kagarko; Kudiri
Kagarko	Kaguni	802116	Kaguni; Kuba; Kuse; Sabon Iche
Kagarko	Katuga	802103	Aribi; Cikin Gari Katugal; Gora 'B'; Kurmin Jibrin; Kushanfa; Sabon Gai Katugal
Kagarko	Kenyi	802106	Kadah; Kahir; Kenyi; Kukyer; Kuratam; Kutaho
Kagarko	Kubacha	802107	Bakin Kasuwa Kubacha; Icce; Kabara; Kuakui; Kubacha
Kagarko	Kurmin Dangana	802110	Dogo Daji; Kasaru; Kurmin Dangana; Ruzai
Kagarko	Kushe	802109	Koyi; Kuchi; Kushe; Kushe Makaranta
Kagarko	Shadalafya	802108	Kampani; Nkojo; Shadalafiya
Kajuru	Kajuru	800105	Gefe; Kajuru Town; Kallah; Kasuwan Magani; Kutara; Libere; Rimau
Kajuru	Kufana	800106	Afago; Iburu; Idon; Iri; Kufana; Makyali; Maro; Rafin-Kunu; Unguwan Gamo
Kaura	Biniki	801153	Apio Kura; Azente; Biniki; Mayigbung; Me-Bonet; Tinat Akut; Tsok - Waney
Kaura	Bondong	801118	Akuku; Bondong; Chanshia; Chikka; Me-Boye; Me-Bung; Me-Kpakpang; Me-Kura; Me-Sankwai; Tsok Adam; Tsoknbwanu; Tyekum
Kaura	Chawai	811103	Baduran; Daduru; Damakasuwa; Fadan Chawai; Kamuru; Kidundun; Kiffin; Kizakoro; Mai Zanko; Pari; Riban; Zanbina
Kaura	Fada	801132	Agafuwat; Kadau; Koduak; Oagun Tsuod; Oegbarak; Tuyit; Ung. Rimi; Zankan
Kaura	Fada Ciki Gari	801117	Fada Cikin Gari; Fada Dutse; Khikarak; Ung. Katungi; Utak Ua'o; Uz Ua'o
Kaura	Fadan Attakar	801156	Anturung; Fadan Attakar; Tachira I
Kaura	Fadan Takad	801157	Katsak; Sakinye; Tajak
Kaura	Garaji	801120	Ung. Ashim; Utak Kamunan; Uza Kajung; Zumuruk
Kaura	Geshere	811102	Apapa; Binawa; Bital; Fadan IIaibi; Fandan Kono; Gasa; Geshere; Gwandara; Kankawar; Kihogo; Kinono; Kudaru; Kushafa; Kusheka; Kushori; Madauchi; Madauci-Kitimi; Pikal; Rishiwa
Kaura	Gizagwai	801152	Aze-Nok; Gizagwai; Me-Kukat; Me-Nkah; Tsok-Amin
Kaura	Kadarko	801113	Agaya, Manyi, Makebum; Kangurung; Makan Uzah; Manyi Dibab; Tukum; Utwan; Uzah Akpi; Zafan
Kaura	Kajim	801155	Abuwat; Atuka Randiyam; Aze-Ahui; Bungen; Kajim; Mahuta; Me-Sanet; Rafin Sanyi; Randiyam; Tyekum
Kaura	Kara	801112	Chan-Tsuwan; Fabuwang; Gasansa; Kaura; Konkwot; Ma-Gattah
Kaura	Kauru	811101	Dawaki; Galadimawa; Kauru; Kware; Kwassam; Magajin-Gari; Majidadi; Makami; Wutana
Kaura	Kpak	801133	Anyah; Kpak; Kpen; Makera; Safiyo; Sakong; Turap; Ung. Hausawa
Kaura	Kukum Daji	801131	Kafi Tahuwop; Lawkok; Tirim; Tswokwai; Zakwa
Kaura	Kukum Gida	801116	Aduan; Kankasa; Kpiruk; Kukum Dutse; Kukum Gida; Manyii Kukum
Kaura	Malagum (Zali)	801134	Abum; Kasaru; Katanga; Madamai; Manta Takum; Tsayeb; Tswokawai; Tum; Ung. Mission; Uzah Atsuan; Zali; Zangang
Kaura	Manchok	801114	Akwa-wak; Apio kura; Atak - Tsok; Manchok; Me-Akut; Me-Ashin; Me-Kajit; Me-Mallam; Me-Nache; Me-yara; Sabon - Gari
Kaura	Matuak	801154	Chori Marwa; Hayin Gora; Matuak Giwa; Matuk Rimi; Mayi Chanchiyo; Sakan
Kaura	Mifi	801157	Mifi
Kaura	Tafan	801135	Agban Tafan; Kukum Tafan; Ligaba; Manji Kanjung; Mile One; Misisi; Pasakori; Sabon Gari; Tafan; Tafan Gidan Way; Ung. Ali; Ung. Kaje
Kaura	Tsonjei	801112	Agban Mararaba; Dan; Gban Gida; Sabon Gari Tsonjei; Tsonjei
Kaura	Zankan	801151	Kaladi; Kwarga; Ma-gbag; Me-Mang; Tsok-Gurfu; Zankan
Kubau	Anchau	811107	Anchau; Damau; Dugau; Gadas; Haskiya; Kargi; Kuzuntu; Leren Dutse; Mah; Mkoci; Talata
Kubau	Kubau	811108	Dabo; Dalman; Dandande; Danmaliki; Dutse Wai; Galadima; Kera; Kubau; Mutangi; Pambeguwa; Tafiyau; Zuntu
Kudan	Doka	802105	Ang. Galadima; Ang. Kanawa; Ang. M. Musa; Bakin Sudu; Barde; Daudu; Doka; Guibi; Kanawa; Kyanso; Mahuta; Makoyi; Mazara; Musawa; Tanda; Tashar Dan Kano
Kudan	Hunkuyi	802108	Ang. Dandubo; Ang. Galadima; Ang. Makada; Ang. Malamai; Ang. Tijjani; Ang.Jarmai; Arewaci; Dafa-Dufa; Dan Tsoho; Danbami; Dumuga; Garu; Hunkuyi; Jaja Babba; Jaji; Kyadai Ango; Kyaudai; Musawa; S/ Gari Hukuyi; Sabon layi; Sarama; Shekarau; T/ Icce; T/Matasa
Kudan	Kauran Waki	802107	Ang. Bakoshi; Ang. Garba; Ang. M. Alasan; Ang. Maiyamu; Ang. Makera; Ang. Musa; Ang. Tata; Bankangwa; Baya Fulani; Dan Daso; Dangashi; Dankala; Dantaro; Sabon Gari; Sanda; Tashan Sani; Tauran Wali; Yalwa
Kudan	Kudan	812104	Ang Duste; Ang. Kanawa; Ang. Labalo; Ang. Ma aji; Damaski; Kadama; Kudan; Marku; Matarawa; Nasarawan kudan; Randa; Rimin Biso; Sabon Lemu; Tashan Kade; Zabi
Kudan	L. Ikoro	802106	Bagaddi; Dangayya; Dokah; G/Kudi; G/Mai Gari; Gidan D/Birni; Gwandawa; Hawan Mai Mashi; Kadad Kada; Katsinawa; Kushigi; Lafiyi; Likoro; Rafin Kira; S/gari Likoro; S/Gida; T/Daudu; T/wada; Tashan Jirgi; Tsauni; Tsinka
Lere	Garu	811105	Amon Danboyi; Dabban Fadama; Garu Kurama; Gure; Gurza; Jama s Iya; Janji; Kahugu; Karanbana; Kargi; Kurmin Dodo; Lawuna; Mariri; Piti Warsa; Ragwa; Unguwar PA
Lere	Kadaru	811106	Bisallah-Hausa; Bita Rana; Disallah; Goron Dutse; Kaku; Kargi; Kudaru-Kurama; Kudaru-Tasha; Maigamo; Rumaiya; Ukissa; Weire; Wuroko; Yarkasuwa
Lere	Lere	811104	Abadawa; Dan Alhaji; Dan Alhaji II; Juran Karama; Juran Kari; Kayarda; Kayor; Lazuru; Lere; Maresu; Ramin-Kura; Sabon Birni; Saminaka; Sugau; Tuddai; Woba
Makarfi	Makarfi	812103	Dan Auamaka; Dandamisa; Danguzuri; Dorayi; Durun; Gangara; Gazara; Gimi; Gubuchi; Gwanki; Kwatakware; Makarfi; Marke; Mayere; Nassarawa; Rahama; Ruma; Sabon Garin Daji
Sabon Gari	Basawa	810106	Barashi; Basawa Tsakiya; Bauda; Biso; Dan-Makwarwa; Galadima; Gwanda Tsakiya; Kwari; Layin Zomo Tsakiya; Madaki; Malam Sale; Palladan Tsakiya; Rimin Tsiwa; SakadadiTsakiya; Sarkin Fulani; Ung. Amfani; Ung. Barau; Ung. Makera; Ung. Na'inna; Ung. Rimi Village; Ung. Yaro; Ung. Turaki; Ung. Dan- Gaiya; Ung. Fulani; Ung. Hayin-Liman; Ung. Sabon-Layi; Ung.Malam Halilu; Zangon Dan-Baro
Sabon Gari	Sabon Gari (Rural)	810103	Ang-Gabas; Babban Titi; Bassawa; Bomo; Cediyar Bawa; Chikaji; Daurawa Tsakiya; Dogarawa; Dogon Bauchi; Dorawar Malami; Durumin Sabbi; Gwanda; Hanwa; Hayin Ojo; Jama'a; Jushin Waje; Machiya; Mangwarori; Palladan; Sabon Gari; Sakadadi; Shika Dam; Tsugugi; Ung Yamma; Unguwar Kasuwa; Unguwar Tabacco; Yan-Awaki; Zabi
Sabon Gari	Samaru	810107	Bomo Tsakiya; Bomo Village; Gwada Tsakiya; Jama'a Tsakiya; Kallon -Kura Tsakiya; Mil-goma Tsakiya; Samaru Tsakiya; Samaru Village; Ung. Arewaci; Ung. Bamunna; Ung. Dan-lami; Ung. Dan'ayu; Ung. Dansa'a; Ung. Hayin Danyaro; Ung. Hayin Liman; Ung. Hayin Malam Tsoho; Ung. Hayin Sambo; Ung. Iya; Ung. Kaya; Ung. Koraye; Ung. Kurani; Ung. Kwakwaren Manu; Ung. Kwanin Kubanni; Ung. Kwari; Ung. Liman; Ung. Madaki; Ung. Maiwada; Ung. Makaranta; Ung. Nasarawa; Ung. Rinji; Ung. Samanja; Ung. Sarki; Ung. Sojoji; Ung. Tsauni; Ung. Yalwa Tsakiya; Ung. Yaranda; Ung. Yardorawa Tsakiya; Ung. Zangon Shanu; Ung.Tsamiya
Sanga	Aboro	801129	Abu; Ambi Oga; Ayuba; Baka; Dakachi; Dakaci Antor; Dauda; Dauda Kudu; Fasu; Gabas; Halidu; Hausawa; Ibo; Jarawa; Jingina; Joko One; Joko Two; Karfan; Kogun; Kubal; Kulere; Kwanta; Liman; Mada; Mada II; Madaki; Mai Kmbu; Makera; Mallam Musa; Mallam Nuhu; Mangu; Manzi; Maroa; Mato; Ninzo; Ninzo Mada; Nunku; Oara; Rumbu; Sakiya; Sarki; Sarki Aboro; Sarki Cheche; Sarki Gargajiya; Sarki Hausawa; Sarki Kwal; Sarki Mada; Sarki Nami; Sarki Numer 6; Sarki Sabonlayi; Sarki Yamman; Sarki Zangin; Selenan; Tukura; Waziri; Yamma; Zalidu; Aboro Dakaci; Aboro Gida; Ardo Fulani Aboro; Ardo Fulani Ajagwai; D/Kutal; Dakachi Fulani; Dakachi Gongoro; Dakaci Jangwai; Dakaci Kubal; Forom; Gidan Mai; Gidan Mai Arewa; Gidan Mai Kudu; Gyere; Hayen Dem; Kubal Sakiya; Lani Shanu; Marwa; Pole Waya; Sabon Layi; Takar; Tudun Wada; Ung. Dakaci; Ung. Gongoro Gida; Ung. Jarawa; Ung. Kwara; Ung. Kwassu; Ung. Mada; Ung. Saidu; Ung. Sarki Gwasan; Ung. Sarki Jangwai; Ung. Sarki Kudu; Ung. Sarki Kutal; Wakili Fulani Aboro; Wakili Fulani Antor
Sanga	Amar	801125	Bawa Ambi; Dakaci Akonkrin; Dakaci Amar Tita; Dakaci Bako; Dakaci Landa; Dakaci Makeri Landa; Dakaci Telekpo; Ibrahim; Monday Waziri; Primary Amar; Sarki Landa Gbasar; Sarki Amar Kontogora; Sunday Compani Kontogora; Amar Angwa Ahmadu Ngbo; Amar Jatau; Amar Sarki Musa; Kontogora; Ung. Danladi Tufa; Ungwa Dakaci Amar Ingba; Ungwa Dakaci Ambo Amar Lada; Ungwa Maikwara
Sanga	Ambel	801120	Boyi; Dakaci Anka; Dakaci Gipa; Madaki Anka; Madaki Ghonbur; Sarki Kadan Ahmadu; Sarki Nigbu; Sarki Yamma; Sule Aboro; Tela Chessu; Timis; Anbel 'A'; Anbel 'B'; Ang. Waziri 'A'; Angwai 'A'; Angwai 'B'; Babur Dakaci; Fatu; Ishen Gba; Sabo Sanglo; Ung. Adamu Makama; Ung. Atili 'B' Sarki Baba Salihu; Ung. Atili Sarki Abbas; Ung. Bako; Ung. Habu Yakubu; Ung. Iliya Dugba; Ung. Markus Injih; Ung. Yakubu Adamu; Ung. Yusuf Anof; Ungw Sarki Bure; Ungwa Bala Mai Lambu; Ungwa Sule Aboro
Sanga	Ancha	801127	Malla Mamman; Ache Anigbulu; Ajiya; Amwue Idzi; Ayuba Anikyu; Bagaji; Dakachi Dodo; Dakachi Tataura; Fulani Bahago; Fulani Ruwah; Galadima; Godo Tudu; Isah Fulani; Kadarko Fulani; Kogi; Madaki Godo; Madaki Idzi; Mahammadu; Maikudi Bature (Amangbo) 1; Sabo Amueh; Sarki Akawu (Ancha Gida); Sarki Ambi; Sarki Aninkla; Sarki Noma; Sarkin Fada (Adamu Yabo); Shamaki; Thoma Amos Tudu Wada; Wakili; Waziri; Yakubu Anikri; Dakachi Ahmadu; Ung. Akochun; Ung. Gimba; Ung. Makama; Ung. Ogha; Ung. Samuel Ungbo Amunikri; Ung. Sarki Zambur; Ungwa Ayawa Sidi; Ungwa Madaki (Amangbo II)
Sanga	Ayu	801107	Makaranta; Tukura; Abu Kampani; Abu Makaranta; Alan; Ayu Gari; Chambwa; Gari; Gbaku; Gbun Tashi; Gbuzhi; Gogo; Jege; Kanjan; Kimba; Koshu; Kpaji; Kpoto; Marinjo; Ninyu; Ragga Ung. Dakachi; Regga Makaranta; SMBE Gari Ung. Dakachi; Takpe; Ung. Abeku; Ung. Gbantar; Ung. Kuza; Ung. Mada; Ung. Maichibi; Ung. Mangoro; Ung. Sarkin Hausawa; Ung. Yakubu; Unzahu; Unzhakpaji
Sanga	Bokana	801121	Ado Naira; Amantur; Audu Galadima; Ayaba; Bahago; Bala Sansani; Challa; Dakaci Fadan Ayu; Dakaci Fulani; Dakaci Hausawa; Dakaci Nungu; Dakacin Gashinbaki; Dariya; Haruna Adamu; Ibrahim; Idi Lawal; Iliya; Jibirin; Joseph; Mada 'A'; Mada 'B'; Mada Eggon; Mallam Tanimu; Mangu; Nandu; Nungu Bokana; Salihu; Salihu Kurma; Salihu Musa; Sansani; Sarki Fadan Ayu; Sarki Ibo; Sarki Ibus; Sarki Kwagiri; Sarki Ninzo; Sarki Yoruba; Shehu; Yakubu; Yakubu Habu; Mantur; Pole Waya Boana; Ung. Maisamari; Ungwa Adu Duwaru; Ungwa Dakaci Gwade; Ungwa Sarki Kongo; Ungwa Theological Seminary Ayu
Sanga	Fadan Karshi	801105	Andakure; Ankirin; Bom B.; C & D; Dogon Daji; Doromiya; Gimi Dogora; Hayen Dem; Janagwa; Kabau; Kan Kurmi; Karshi; Karshin Daji; Kawo; Kayarda; Kurmi Gero Sarki; Kwagibi; Mahanga; Mile One; Mom C.; Nasarawa; Sabon Gida; Sabon Gida Gabas; Sabon Layi; Sabon Zawan; Sabongari; Tsoho Gari; Tsohon Gri; Tudun Wada; Ung. Abamu; Ung. Amutu; Ung. Ardo Fulani; Ung. Ardo Fulani Karshi; Ung. Bauchi; Ung. Bawa; Ung. Bera; Ung. Dakaci F/Karsh; Ung. Dakaci Fulani; Ung. Dakaci Gimi; Ung. Donka; Ung. Fada; Ung. Fulani; Ung. Gambo; Ung. Ganye 'A'; Ung. Gayen 'B'; Ung. Gindiri; Ung. Goma; Ung. Gwandara; Ung. Hausawa; Ung. Hausawa K/Goro; Ung. Ibrahim; Ung. Jere; Ung. Kampani; Ung. Kurmi Goro Titi; Ung. Kyayang; Ung. Mada; Ung. Maigoro; Ung. Mande; Ung. Nandu; Ung. Numana; Ung. Pah Amale; Ung. Para; Ung. Rindiri; Ung. Sale; Ung. Tanko; Ung. Tella; Vom; Yakwet; Zagzawan
Sanga	Fadan Ninzo	801108	Galadima Amugbonche; Madaki; Galadima; Iya Umugbonche; Makaranta Mission Maitozo; Alhaji Ruwa; Amutongbo; Fulani; Makaho; Makama; Makama Dorawa; Pakachi; Sarki; Sarki Amugboche; Shehu; Tukura Pakachi; Ubandoma; Wambai; Waziri; Waziri Pakachi; Bahago; Dakachi Sambe; Joga; Madaki Fulani; Sarki Amubi; Sarki Yaki - Maitozo; Iyah Gbara; Musa Anto; Musha Anche; Pakachi Hallo; Sarki Maigoro; Wakili Irimiya Gabata; Atungbe Gya Gbara; Dakachi - Amubimaji; Jarami; Ung. Dagachi
Sanga	Gunkok	801130	Andun; Angwak; Ankolo; Awali; Forest Arak; Gada Biyu; Gbunkok; Isan; Jenda Sarki; Karkashi; Labari; Langa; Rugan Ardo; Rugan Madaki; Sabon Gari; Tsauni Kulere; Tsauni Majindadi; Tudun Wada Arak; Un.g. Saiau; Ung. Abamu; Ung. Adamu; Ung. Duhu; Ung. Durumi; Ung. Ingila; Ung. Kwara; Ung. Magaji; Ung. Maikyau; Ung. Makama; Ung. Tudu; Ung. Wakili Isan; Ung. Wambai; Ung. Yaro; Ung. Yaute; Ung. Yerima
Sanga	Gwantu	801106	Aban; Afragbang; Agom; Akongk; Akoshen; Ambe Sarki; Bashayi; Dangam Aneye; Dangam Aniti; Gani Madaki; Gbanzu; Gbongang; Gobir; Guantu; Gwantu Kurmin Dakaci; Kiban; Mada; Madaki; Numbu Dakaci; Nunbu Kono; Sanga Haruna; Sarki; Shehu; Ung. Biri; Ung. Ganye; Ung. Giginya; Ung. Goge; Ung. Hausawa; Ung. Idzi; Ung. Ningon; Ung.Maikasa; Ung.Mandu; Zang
Sanga	Hatteh	801123	Alhaji Ruwa; Amutongbo; Atungbo-Gya Gbatar; Bahago; Dakachi Amubimaji; Dakachi Auganche; Dakachi Fulani; Dakachi Sambe; Fulani Dorowa; Galadima; Galadima Amugbonche; Iyah Gbara; Jerami; Joga; Lamido; Madaki; Madaki Amugbonche; Madaki Fulani; Madaki Sambe; Maikafo; Makaa; Makama Dorowa; Makaranta Mission Maitozo; Mukama Pakachi; Musa Anto; Musha Anche; Pakachi Hallo; Sarki Amubi; Sarki Amuganche; Sarki Amugbonche; Sarki Amukunche; Sarki Ango Gbatar; Sarki Maigoro; Sarki Sambe; Sarkin Yaki Maitozo; Shehu; Tukura; Uandoma; Ubandoma; Wakili; Wakili Irimiya Gbatar; Wambai; Waziri; Waziri Gbata; Waziri Pakachi; Yaki; Yamusa; Tukura Pakachi; Ungwa Dakachi; Ungwa Iya Umugbonche; Ungwa Pakachi
Sanga	Kwassu	801126	Amun Cheyo; Amwe; Dakaci Anzere; Dakaci Chugon; Dakaci Gajere; Dakaci Makeri; Dakaci Rimi; Galadima; Madaki; Madaki Awawa (Atu); Madaki Yakubu; Makama; Makaranta; Makeri; Mangoro (Rimi); Monday Anto; Mu-Konche; Sarki Anzah Agboh; Sarki Anzere Gbuja; Sarki Bala Akonza; Sarki Chiroma; Sarki Langa-Langa; Sarki Ninhan; Sarki Tudun Wada (Rimi); Sarki Tukura; Vantar Anzere; Sarki Amunikri; Sarki Daniel; Ung. Dangaladima Joseph; Ung. Galadima Chugon; Ung. Madaki Musa; Ung. Sarki Amuku; Ung. Sarki Soja; Ung.Sarki Ichi San; Ungwa Bakasi; Ungwa Dakaci Kwassu; Ungwa Sarki Amuneiba
Sanga	Mayir	801119	Agas; Akumukun; Alheri; Ankub; Arau; Awgon; Balawes; Digel; Gokwi; Hayen Gada; Ibag; Iden; Kwanan Tigen; Mayir Amanchik; Saken Tigon; Sankwai; Tayu; Tigekn; Ung. Ardo Fulani; Ung. Dakaci Fulani; Ung. Dakaci Hausawa; Ung. Mada Mayir; Ung. Madaki Ali; Ung. Sarki Adamu Yabame; Ung. Sarki Hausawa Nuhyu; Ung. Sarki Mallam Kasimu; Ung. Sarki Ninzo; Ung. Sarki Sale; Ung. Sarki Tari; Yabme
Sanga	Randa	801124	Abu Kinu (Rimi); Dakaci Iron Zikina Richu; Dakaci Tari Ngbo; Dorowa; Gwanda; Sarki Idzi; Sarki Maiakama; Antishi; Burtu; Maitakama; Randa; Randa Kasa; Sabon Gari Randa; Ung. Dakaci Ziku; Ung. Mission; Ungwa Hausawa Randa; Ungwa Madaki Randa; Ungwa Makama Karama
Sanga	Tari	801122	Abandi; Agal; Aku Mallo; Alang; Asibiti; Audu Tari; Awarmashik; Badakoshi; Bahago; Bola; Dauda; Fulani Tari; Gaiya; Galadima; Gbakip; Gimba; Gwamna Tari; Haye Aku; Haye Bala; Haye Knoka; Joshua; Kofai; Madaki; Makama; Makaranta; Makeri; Rimi; Sarki; Sarki Makama; Sarki Matasa; Sarki Nome; Sule; Tukurah; Turaki; Ubakmuich; Ubarif; Ubnadoma; Uloh; Waziri; Yara; Yara Tari; Timis; Ung. Sarki Ahmadu Mada; Ungwa Barde; Ungwa Kako; Ungwa Maihibi; Ungwa Makaranta
Sanga	Ung/Sarki	801131	Madaski Ngbok; Adamu; Ahmadu; Ardo Fulani; Asibiti Ibrahim; Ayuba Bashayi; Bawa Magaji; Dakaci Fulani; Danjuma; Galadima; Gora; Joseph Audu; Lawal Ankpong; Madaki; Madaki Ankpong; Madaki Kobin; Magaji Ankpong; Magaji Ningeshe Kurmi; Mangu Danladi; Sarkin Yaki Ankara; Tukura Ankara; Waziri; Akai; Akwakwan; Ankara Dogon Fili; Ankara Makaranta; Ankpong; Dogon Fili; Kaso; Kobin; New Karu; Ngbotiti; Ningeshe Dutse; Ningeshe Kurmi; Ningo Gari; Ningo Kirya; Pogari; Rafin Tagwaye; T/Wada 'A'; T/Wada 'B'; T/Wada 'C'; Ung. Adamu Maikaho; Ung. Giginya; Ung. Manja; Ung. Sarki Numa; Ung. Tari; Ung. Tukura; Ung. Yakubu Bawa; Ungbok; Upo Dirri; Upo Nkiri; Wambe
Sanga	Wasa	801128	Abuja Mada; Ako; Ani Pantinya; Anji; Atau; Bril Tsada; Daniel; Duhu; Ggon; Gobara; Hausawa; Idah; Ishaya; Jacob; Jirgi; Kwakwasa; Nungu; Sabo; Agbere; Ahar Ko Fai; Anzah; Aworo Sarki; Baki Kogi; Gwaska; Kofe Ahar; Miski; Pantiwa; Rafin Soja; Sarki Yeskwa; Takwa; Tataura Pantiya; Tudu Wada; Ung. Abu; Ung. Akawa; Ung. Amos Yakubu; Ung. Anche; Ung. Goho; Ung. Hosea Pantiyan; Ung. Ishaya Pantiya; Ung. Jibrin; Ung. Lamba; Ung. Mangoro; Ung. Mudi; Ung. Pah; Ung. Pah 'A'; Ung. Pah 'B'; Ung. Tasha; Ungwa Jamage; Ungwa Musulmi; Wuro Andaha
Soba	Maigana	810101	M. Yahaya; Ang. Galla; Damari; Fagachi; Fari-Kaa; Gimba; Goirawa; Hayin Kinkiba; Kin-kiba; Kuzai; Kwai; Ma-birni; Madaba; Maferawa; Magada; Marwa; Matari; Richifa; Sabon Kudi; Sambvirni; Tamba; Wanka; Yakasai; Yalwa mai akaranta; Yelwa mai Bene
Soba	Soba	810102	Alhazawa; Ang. Madaki; Ang. Mall dogo; Bakura; Barwa; Dan-Isa; Dan-jaba; Dan-wata; Dinya; Dorayi; Gamagira; Garun-Gwanki; Gurbabiya; Kaware; Kuyamutsa; Kwasallo; Lungu; Mai-0Zare; Makoron-lemo; Marmara; Taba; Taka-Lafiya; Tkurwa; Turawa
Zangon Kataf	Abet	802128	Abet; Achin; Anguwan Jatau; Kumi; Marabang
Zangon Kataf	Afana	802126	Afana; Katsit
Zangon Kataf	Ampaga	802148	Boto; Dinarah; Fadan Ikulu; Lisuri Gida; Lisuru Daji; Sabon Kaura Fadan Ikulu; Ungwan Amawa Lisuru; Ungwan Fulani; Ungwan Goska; Ungwan Rana Lisuru; Unwan Digabi
Zangon Kataf	Anchuna	802134	Akoka; Amawa Lisuru; Burgu; Digabi; Jirayi; Kachia; Makama; Nauta; Sani; Sarki; Toro Ali; Toro Gida; Akurjini; Ampaga; Boto; Dankurasa; Dinarah; Dutsen Bako; Fadan Ikulu; Gida Ali; Kwarkwano; Lisuri Gida; Lisuru Daji; Sabon Kaura Akupal; Sabon Kaura Fadan Ikulu; Ung. Dodo; Ung. Fulani; Ung. Gauta; Ung. Gimba; Ung. Goska; Ung. Pate; Ung. Rana Lisuru; Ung.Nauta; Ung.Rimi (Gidol); Ung.Wakili Surubu; Ung.Yawa
Zangon Kataf	Atak Nfang (Zaman Dabo)	802142	Atakfang; Chawai Z/Dabo; Doka; Sansak; Z/Awon; Z/Dabo
Zangon Kataf	Atak Njei (Unguwar Gaiya)	802130	Mayayit (Ung. Jaba); Juju; Magata (G/Gata) I; Mavong; Tagama; U/Gaiya
Zangon Kataf	Bafoi (Bafoi Kanai, Bafoi Gora)	802145	Bafoi; G/Gimba; G/Kalli; Galadimawa; Kishaura; Mavong; Rafin Saiwa
Zangon Kataf	Fadan Kaje	802120	Fadan Kaje Gida; Kazantsok; Machia; Rumfa; Tabak; Tsohon Gida; Unguwa Bakan
Zangon Kataf	Fadiya	802121	Fadiya Bossan; Fadiya Gugah; Fadiya Mugu Gida; Fadiya Raku Gida; Fadiya Yazonom; Fafom gida; Gida; Jei Agaguk; Jei Aruwan; Jei Atoche; Jei Atom; Jei Baje; Jei Dishia; Jei Gana; Jei Gugah; Jei Kama-Nbrang; Kar (Ungwa) Rankpak; Kar Abuchet; Kar Abukam; Kar aco; Kar Afifak; Kar Akau; Kar Aruwan; Kar Atare; Kar Ayia; Kar Baje; Kar Bui; Kar Cham; Kar Dambvu; Kar Doka; Kar Gagk; Kar Gimba; Kar Gwana; Kar Jatau; Kar Kachat; Kar Kajere; Kar Kamayi-Ntun; Kar Kubin; Kar Kura; Kar Kure; Kar Kwadun; Kar Kwaru; Kar Kyama; Kar Kyang; Kar Kyuka; Kar Lekwot; Kar San; Kar Sule; Kar Suman; Yaribuwan; Zagom Gida
Zangon Kataf	Farman	802127	Abvong; Farman; Gatsa; Kanem; Rikabom; Satwang
Zangon Kataf	Gora	802139	Atabat Atanyeang; B/Kogi Gora; Gora; Gora Gida (Atsung Abyek); K/Gandu; K/Kwara; Kakwa; Magankon; Magankon K/Kwara; Makutzalen; Sabon Gari; Sabon Gari Gora; Sagwaza; Sakwa'at; T/Wada Gora; Warkan
Zangon Kataf	Jankasa	802141	Apyinzwang; Awak; Jankasa (Ashong Ashyui); Kacecere; Kacecere Hausawa; Kangwaza; Kurfi; Magadankura; Male; Manta Aswon; Manyii Aminyam; Manyii Ashyui; U/Gawayi
Zangon Kataf	Kabam	802152	Balet; Boro; Gidan Maga; Kabam; Shankyuak; Tiyat; Ungwn Hausawa; Yal Calihu; Yal Kura; Yal Yaje
Zangon Kataf	Kamuru	802133	Antang Dutse; Antang Gida; Anzah Gida; Anzah Sarki; Bakin Lamba; Fange; Fansil; Gapiyi; Kamuru Dutse; Kamuru Hausa; Kamuru Ikulu; Katul Anzah; Ngwan Wakili Kamuru; Ungwan Nache; Ungwan Basheru; Ungwan Fulani; Ungwan Gaiya; Ungwan Giwa; Ungwan Shehu; Ungwan Zomo
Zangon Kataf	Kamurum	802123	Abafot; Fanjim; Kamurum; Kanem; Kukan; Kurdan; Sakwak; Satwang; Ung. Ariyahwi; Ung. Magaji; Ung. Rana; Zauru
Zangon Kataf	Kangun	802153	Chigyam; Kangun; Rinyam; Sabon Kaura; Yaron Fada
Zangon Kataf	Kibori	802144	Atakmawai; Atisa; K/Masara; Kan Kurmi; Kibori; U/Maichibi
Zangon Kataf	Kurmin Bi	802119	Ahzahwa; Akobe; Akodon; Atagraya; Azakwat; Chanya; Karatuk; Karibwake; Karigwahan; Karikahuat; Karisaka; Kati; Kurmin - Bi; Madauchi; Ung. Ayo
Zangon Kataf	Kwakhwu	802146	Ayagbak; Mamaidawa; Sanzyiam; Shilyam; Takanai
Zangon Kataf	Ladduga	802149	Ladduga; Ungwan Nasarawa; Wuro Borno; Wuro Fulbe Centre; Wuro Mayo; Wuro Nyako
Zangon Kataf	Mabushi	802131	Bafio; F/ Tsoho; G/ Gimba; G/ Kagrau; G/ Kalli; Galadima; K/ Dawaki; Kishaura; Mabushi; Madoo; Manwai; Masukwai; Mavong; Rafin Saiwa; Salau
Zangon Kataf	Madakiya (Batadon)	802137	Atat; Ayagan; Bankwa; Bodari; Bvongkphnang; Dinyiring; Galadima; Hurgyam; Kpong; Madakiya; Twan; Zitti
Zangon Kataf	Manyii-Aghyui	802132	Ayagbak; Chibob; Kigudu; Kwakhwu; Magwafan; Mamaidawa; Matyei; Mawa; Runji; S/Kaura; Sabanfan; Sako; Sanzyiam; Shilim; Takanai; U/Alagaba; U/Rohogo; Zarkwai
Zangon Kataf	Marsa	802129	Arikawan; Chenchuk; Kphunyai; Marsa
Zangon Kataf	Mazaki (Gidan Zaki)	802140	Bakin Kogi (Magwafan); G/Zaki (Mazaki); Maige; Saganda
Zangon Kataf	Taligan (Magamiya)	802143	G/Wuka; Magamia I; Taligan
Zangon Kataf	Tsoriyang	802124	Aduwan; Madobiya; Maniya; Rebok; Tsoriyang; Wadon
Zangon Kataf	Tudun Wada	802151	Bayan Dutse; Hyurgyam; Kafom Aruwan; Kafom Doka; Tudun Wada
Zangon Kataf	Unguwan Rimi (Zantarakpat)	802125	Katsit; Unguwan Rimi; Zakwo
Zangon Kataf	Unguwar Rohogo	802147	Magwafan; Matyei; Runji; Sabanfan; Sako; U/Rohogo
Zangon Kataf	Zagom	802150	Chirani; Fadia Aliu; Rafin Juma; Rumpa; Ungw Jatau; Ungwan Dori; Ungwan Mallam; Zagom Gajere
Zangon Kataf	Zangon Kataf	802107	Gabas; Yamma
Zangon Kataf	Ziturung	802122	Abvabvon; Karachiya; Mago; Nkuwan yak; Tinta'a; Turan Kariyi; Turan Kayit; Kangurara; Ziturung Pama; Ziturung Akpang; Ziturung Karyi
Zangon Kataf	Zonkwa	802106	Abaye; Buzu'un; ECWA; Ishaya; Musa; Ruguni; Town Hall; Dauke; Arikuyin; Atakum; Dorow one; Dorowa one; Duchu (Ung. Christopher; Kariburuk; Kok I; Kok II; Kpan Kok; Layin Shaba; Masat; Ramai; Sarki; Ung. Baptist; Ung. Danbaki; Ung. Mission; Ung. Narom; Ung. Rama; Ung. Sanke; Ung. Yabanat; Zanzwan; Zonkwa Central
Zangon Kataf	Zonzon	802138	Mabukhwu; Makutsatim; Mashan; Mawukili; Sakum; U/Tabo; Wawa-rafi; Zonzon
Zaria	Tukur Tukur	810211	Tudun Jukun; Dan Magaji; Kwarin Dan Goma; Gaskiya; Kamacha; Magume; Hayin Usama; Unguwar Rafi; Hayin Dogo
Zaria	Dambo	810280	Dambo; Dakace; Unguwan Sarkin Noma; Unguwan Katika; Bizara; Mangu; Kakiyeyi; K/Mai Rago

== By electoral ward ==
Below is a list of polling units, including villages and schools, organised by electoral ward.

LGA	Ward	Polling Unit Name
Birnin Gwari	Magajin Gari I	Education Office; Pry. Sch. Shitu; Area Court; Community School; Islamiya Pry. Sch.; Maigwari Pry. Sch.; Library Office; Pry. Sch. Ung. Liman; Ung Ali Gado; Leprosy Clinic; G. S. S. B/Gwari; B. A. T. C. B/Gwari
Birnin Gwari	Magajin Gari II	Sport Council Office; S/Yaki Pry. Sch.; R. E. B. Power House I; R. E. B. Power House II; Bagoma Pry. Sch.; V. I. O. Office Bagoma; Dogon Hawa Pry. Sch.; Ung. Fari Pry. Sch; Ung. Kwambe; Bugai Pry. Sch.; Ung. Laya; Ung. Dogara; Ung. Zaman Dagi; Ung. Awaro; Tv Centre; Tv Centre II; V. I. O. Office; Ung. Dan Yaya; K. M. Habibu Arabic Sp.; K/Mai Unguwa Ijinga; Tudun Jega Pry. Sch.; Ung. Gobirawa
Birnin Gwari	Magajin Gari III	Old B/Gwari Pry. Sch.; Old Saulawa Pry. Sch.; New Saulawa; Ung. Nachibi; Ung. Gobirawa; Maganda Pry. Sch; K. M. Maganda Pry. Sch.; Ung. Goron Dutse; Gwaska Pry. Sch.; Ung. Bakanike; Ung. Nabango; Kwaigan Magaji; Kiryayi; Farin Ruwa; Tashan Leda
Birnin Gwari	Gayam	Gayam Pry. Sch.; Health Clinic Gayam; Kwaga Pry. Sch; Kwaga Clinic; Pole Waya; Kagi Pry. Sch.; Labi; Kofar Gidan M/Ung.; Rumana Pry. Sch; Rumana Gwari; Kirazo Pry. Sch.; K/Doka Pry. Sch.; Ung. Gobirawa; K. M. K/Doka; Ung. Danganji; Ung. Mamara; K. M. Kungi; Mando Pri. Sch.; Ung. Layin M/Gwari; Ung. Garaye; Rafin Kura
Birnin Gwari	Kuyelo	Dunya Pry. Sch.; Ung/ Hassan Bodo; Ashamagama; Ung. Dan Dungu Jega; Ung. Shado; Ung. Manda; Old Kuyello Pry. Sch.; Ung. Gwandu (A); Ung Mai Dakankani; K. M. Farin Batu; New Kuyello Pry. Sch.; T. V. Centre (A); T. V. Centre (B); Ung. S/Noma; Ung. S/Buwayi; K. M. Gungama; K. G. Nabayi; K. M. Kwadaga; Ung. Maiyasuma; Ung. Maida Kakini; Kwasa-Kwasa; Ung. Gara
Birnin Gwari	Kazage	Gwanda Pry. Sch.; Ung. Ritafi; Ung. Nakaka; Ung. Dankande; Kazage Gari; K. M. Kinashi; Ingade Pry. Sch.; K. M. Kuduru; Damari Pry. Sch.; Ung. Madaki; Ung. Madaki II; Ung. Gobirawa; Ruwan Sarki; Ung. Jaruwa; Ung. Katsinawa; Ung. Bilya
Birnin Gwari	Kakangi	Kakangi Pry. Sch.; Dispensary; Ung. Ishiwai; Ung. Sule Magani; Sabon Layi Pry. Sch.; Sabon Gari/Sabon Layin II; Tashan Kaji; K. M. Musa K/Bango; Ung. Zakara S/Noma; K. M. Bawa; K. M. Gagumi; Ung. Baraje Pry. Sch.; K./M Kurgi; Ung. Kiyafa; Shiwaka; S/Garin Kubau; Ung. Ganda; Ung. Mai Kidin Ginsa; Ung. Dogon Sarki; Ung. Liman
Birnin Gwari	Tabanni	New Tabanni Pry. Sch.; Ung. Danjuma Tela; Layin Lasan Pry. Sch.; Layin Lasan Pry. Sch. II; Ung. Nakurmi; K. M. Lasan; K. M. Dokan Ruwa; K. M. Maikya Suwa; K. M. Kwala-Kwangi; K. M. Mgarba; Ung. Majara; Ung. Dan-Gado; Kurmin Sauchi Pri. Sch.; Old Tabanni; Ung. Tumu; Ung. S/Fawa; Ung. S/Noma
Birnin Gwari	Dogon Dawa	K. M. Kwasau; K. G. Alhaji Shehu; Dogon-Dawa Pry. Sch. I; Funtuan Badadi; Dispensary I; Dispensary II; Tudun Wada D/Dawa; Sabon Gari D/Dawa; Ung. Wusan; Ung. Rafin Tukurwa; Ung. Rafin Gora; Ung. Saminaka; Ung. Gwandara; Funtua Badadi; Ung. Danko Pry. Sch.; Ung. Lacha; Ung. Aduhu
Birnin Gwari	Kutemesi	Old Gandawa; Kawo/Kanawa; Kwashi; Kutemeshi Pry. Sch. I; Kutemeshi Pry. Sch. II; Kofar Musa; Old Kutemeshi; Miya-Miya; Gwadabe; Old Kanawa; Ung. Chindo; Ung. Gambo; Ung. Usman; Ung. Bako; Ung. Madobiya; Ung. Gajere; Ung. Kwahu; Makera; Ung. Maje
Birnin Gwari	Randagi	Randagi Pry. Sch.; Tv. Centre; K. M. Randagi; K. M. Ukuga; K. M. S/Kunun/Gayya; K. M. Kimbi; K. M. Ijinga; Kugi Pry. Sch.; Dawakin Basa Pri Sch; Pry. Sch. Kuki; K. M. Imagu; Nasarawa Pry. Sch. I; Nasarawa Pry. Sch. II; Ung. Aboki; K. M. M/Kigana; Ung. Shirya; Ung. Adda; Ganin Gari; Dawakin Basa Dispensary
Chikun	Chikun	Chikun L. E. A. Pry. Sch.; Chikun Hausa L. E. A. Pry Sch.; Kunfara K/G Sarki; Kabama K/G Sarki; Kafawo K/G Sarki; Dakunu L. E. A. Pry. Sch.; Kasayi K/G Sarki; Kubani K/G Sarki; Katarma I L. E. A. Pry. Sch.; Katarma II K/G/ Mai Angwa; Kuduru K/G Sarki; Chagba K/G Mai Anguwa; Kugo I L. E. A Pry. Sch.; Kugo II L. E. A Pry . Sch.; Kofi K/G Sarki; Kogosi 530 K/G Maianguwa; Magaba K/G Maianguwa; Katarma III K/G Maianguwa L. E. A. Pry. Sch.
Chikun	Gwagwada	Gwagwada Pry. Sch.; Kabarasha Ung. Turai; Gwanzunu/ Gwanzunu; Gajina/ Gajina; Kasarami K/G Sarki; Sabon Sara Pry. Sch.; Bakin Kasuwa Pry. Sch.; Lukuru K/G Sarki; Kuderi/ Kuderi; Konan Bature K/G Maianguwa; Wuya K/G Sarki; Dutse Pry. Sch.; Gadani K/G Sarki; Bashishi/ Bashishi; Kakamai K/G Sarki; Kajari K/G Sarki; Kafana K/G Maianguwa; Dutse II L. E. A. Pry. Sch.
Chikun	Kakau	Kakau Station L. E. A. Pry. Sch.; Kakau Station K/G Sarki; Ung. Sauri L. E. A. Pry. Sch.; Kakau Daji L. E. A. Pry. Sch.; Ligari L. E. A. Pry. Sch.; Kagurna L. E. A Pry. Sch.; Buwaya L. E. A. Pry. School; Sabon Gayan L. E. A. Pry. School; Tsohon Gayan K/G Sarki; Gonin Gora I L. E. A Pry. School; Gonin Gora II K/G Sarki; Ung. Ayaba L. E. A. Pry. School; Kashebo I L. E. A. Pry. School; Kashebo II K/G Maianguwa; Kankomi I L. E. A. Pry. School; Kankomi II / Kasuwan Kankomi; Kaso L. E. A. Pry. School; Kabai I L. E. A. Pry. School; Kabai II K/G Maianguwa; Kadayawa K/G Maianguwa; Jibada K/G Maianguwa; Nabarka K/G Maianguwa; Ung. Busa K/G Sarki; Kubusu L. E. A Pry. School; Sabon Gayan II L. E. A. Pry. School; Kakau Daji II
Chikun	Kujama	Kujama I L. E. A. Pry. School; Kujama II Clinic Kujama; Kujama III F/Store; Kujama IV K/G Sarki; Pamfura I L. E. A. Pry. School; Pamfura II Ung. Maje; Pamfura III L. G / Secretariat; Kafari I L. E. A. Pry. School; Kafari II L. E. A Pry. School; Bugai L. E. A. Primary; S/Gari Bugai K/G Sarki; Gwakun K/G Sarki; Ung. Pada L. E. A. Primary; Talele L. E. A. Primary; Magashanu K/G Sarki; Doka Maijama'a L. E. A. Primary; Sabon Jero L. E. A. Primary; Danhonu Hausa I L. E. A. Primary School; Danhonu Gbagyi L. E. A. Primary; Tokache L. E. A. Primary; Kanrafi L. E. A. Primary; Gora Maijama'a L. E. A. Primary; Maijama'a L. E. A. Primary; Kawu L. E. A. Primary; Kakura L. E. A. Primary; Kurmin Sata L. E. A. Primary; Keke K/G Sarki; Danhonu Hausa K/Gidan Sarki; Kurmin Sata II; Tokache II
Chikun	Kunai	Buruku I G/Mangori T/Titi; Buruku II L. E. A. Primary School; Buruku III B/Kasuwa T/Titi; Kasaya L. E. A. Primary School; Dande K/G Sarki; Kifashi Bakin Kasuwa; Resa K/G Maianguwa; B/Basa K/G Maianguwa; Kabala K/G Maianguwa; Gidan Dutse K/G Maianguwa; Garu L. E. A. Primary School; Gwarso L. E. A Primary School; Zankoro K/G Sarki; Uduwa I L. E. A Primary School; Uduwa II K/G Sarki; Uduwa III Bakin Kasuwa; Ung. Wakili L. E. A. Primary School; Tarugu K/G Sarki; Ung. Rimi K/G Maianguwa; Buruku IV L. E. A. Primary School; Buruku V L. E. A. Primary School; Buruku VI Gin. Mango T. T.
Chikun	Kuriga	Kuriga Area Court / Area Court; Ung. Kawo/ G. Kawo; Kuriga / L. E. A. Primary School; Kuriga / Reading Room; Ung. Zarumai / K/G Takada; Manini / Kasuwa; Sarari Kasuwa / Kasuwa; Ung. Gwarba / Kasuwa; Ung. Barau / Ung. Barau; Sarari / K/G Sarki; Ung. Kwabo / K/G Sarki; Ung. Rahama / Ung. Rahama; Tashan Tsuntsaye / T/Suntsaye; Janmaye / K/G Wakili; Gwauro / K/G Maianguwa; Kunnama / Kunnama; Ung. Sani Gambo / Kofar Sani Gambo; Ung. Doma / Ung. Doma; Tudun Tsakuwa / T/Tsakuwa; Ung. Kawo II / K/Gidan Iyan Kuriga
Chikun	Narayi	Narayi / No 4 Narayi Road; Narayi / L. E. A. Primary School; Narayi / Kataf Close; Narayi / No. 19 Ikulu Road; Narayi / No. 32 Kankia Road; Narayi / No. 11 Wakili Road; Narayi / Bayan Dutse P/Gro; Narayi/ K/G Sarki Narayi; Narayi/ No. 10 Dokaji Road; Narayi/ No. 2 Cinema Close; Narayi/ No. 10 King Hassan H/G; Narayi/ No. 10 Chikun Road; Narayi/ Shagari Road; Narayi/ No. 54 Dadi Road; Narayi/ Sarkin Kwai Road; Narayi/ Sarkin Pawa Road; Narayi/Maiyere Road H/C; Narayi/ Mb 16 Narayi
Chikun	Rido	Rido I / L. E. A. Primary School; Rido Gari II / K/G Sarki; Kudansa I / L. E. A. Primary School; Kudansa II / K/G Sarki; Kudansa III / Sarki M/Rido; Rido III / /Sarki M/Rido; Damishi I/ Primary School; Damishi II/ K/G Maianguwa; Chidunu/ K/G Maianguwa; Ung. Kaje/ K/G Maianguwa; Ung. Rimi/ K/G Maianguwa; Panmadaki/ K/G Maianguwa; Bagado I/ L. E. A. Primary School; Bagado II/ L. E. A. Primary School; Ung. Maigero I/ Kasuwa; Ung. Maigero II/ K/G Maianguwa; Baban Saura I/ L. E. A. Primary School; Rimi II/ K/Gidan Maianguwa; Rimi III/ K/Gidan Maianguwa; Karji I/ L. E. A Primary School; Karji II/ K/G Sarki; Karuga/ Kasuwa; Kamazau I/ L. E. A Primary School; Kamazau II/ K/G Maianguwa; Mahuta I/ K/G Sarki; Mahuta II/ L. E. A Primary School; Kundansa IV Kofar/G Liman; Babansaura II K/G Mainguwa
Chikun	Sabon Tasha	Matari/ Old Court S/Tasha; Matari/ No. 8 Juji Road; Matari/ L. E. A Primary School Sabon Tasha; Matari/ Marwa St. S/Tasha; Matari/ Kafari Close S/Tasha; Matari/ No. 26 Gobir Road; Matari/ No. 33 Kadara Road; Matari/ Nitel Gate S/Tasha; Matari/ Kataf Rd/ Rakiya Hospital; Matari/ Jaba Road S/Tasha; Matari/ Kadara Road (East); Ung. Peter/ Kasuwan Dare S/Tasha; Ung. Biso/ Mango Tree Ung. Biso; Fadaman Jaki/ Durumi Tree; Nnpc/ Nnpc Gate (North); Ung. Gimbiya/ Govt. Sec. Sch. S/Tasha; Juji/ K/G Maianguwa; Ung. Sunday I/ Sani Moh'D Street; Ung. Sunday II/ No. 8 Halima Junction; Ung. Sunday III/ Saidu Chiroma Street; Ung. Sunday IV/ Isah Shadow Street; Ung. Pama I/ K/G Maianguwa Pama; Ung. Pama II/ K/G Sarki; Narayi New Ext. I/ Revenue Office; Narayi New Ext. II/Chikun Street S/ Tasha; Narayi New Ext. III/ Post Office Road; Narayi New Ext. IV/ No. 10 Zaria Road; Narayi New Ext. V/ No. 25 Abuja Road; Narayi New Ext. VI/ Kunai Road; Narayi New Ext. VII/ Kasupda; Ung. Baro I/ L. E. A Primary School; Ung. Baro II/ L. E. A Primary School
Chikun	Ung. Yelwa	Sabon Yelwa/ Iyaka Street (North); Sabon Yelwa/ Iyeka Street (South); Sabon Yelwa/ Kasuwan Gulma (Waziri S); Sabon Yelwa/ No. 2 Doka Road; Sabon Yelwa/ Makaranta Road; Sabon Yelwa/ Chiroma Street; Sabon Yelwa/ Danladi Street Romi; Sabon Yelwa/ L. E. A Primary School; Romi/ Kasuwan Mato Romi; Romi/ L. E. A Primary School; Romi/ Sarki Road; Romi/ Magajin Gari Road Romi; Sabon Yelwa/ L. E. A Primary School S/Yelwa; Ung. Chiroma S/Yelwa/ Ung. Chiroma; Ung. Maianguwa Idi/ Maianguwa Idi; Ma'aji Street/ K/G Sarki; Baka Street/ K/G Ishaya
Chikun	S/Ggarin Arewa Tirkaniya	Sabon Gari/ Gadani Street S/Gari; Sabon Gari/ No. 1 Galadima Road S/G; Sabon Gari/ Nass. Road/Rail S/Gari; Sabon Gari/ No. Gala Road S/Gari; Sabon Gari/ Dankowa Road; Ung. Garba/ Layin Baba Gana; Ung. Daniel I/ Nasarawa Ktb; Ung. Daniel II/ L. E. A Primary School; Ung. Hassan/ Chikun Street S/Gari; Ung. Hassan/ Chikun Street S. Gari; Ung. Maude/ Sarkin Rail; Ung. Maude/ S/Yaki Road Ext.; Kudandan I/ L. E. A Primary School Kudan; Kudandan II/ L. E. A Primary School
Giwa	Giwa	Ung. Darofangi I, II, III,& IV/ Model Pri. Sch. Giwa; Ung. Liman I, II & III/ Fertilizer Store (Gidan Taki); Ung. Tanimu I, II/ Nepa Giwa; Tsohuwar Giwa/ Kofar Gidan Mai Ung. Nababa; Wardanga & Ung. Hausawa/ Mashigin Kada; Mashingin Kada/ Mashingin Kada; Dundubus I/ L. E. A Dundubus; Dundubus II & III/ L. E. A Dundubus; Ung. Danfangi V & Unng. M. Ibrahim/ Kofar Mai Unguwar Mal. Ibrahim; Tsanin Tsohuwar Giwa/ Kofar Mai Unguwa; Hayin Mahauta/ Kofar Mai Unguwa; Ung. Danfangi III & IV/ Wardanga; Ung/Danfangi/Mall. Ibrahim/ Kofar Mai Unguwa
Giwa	Gangara	Ung. S. Gangara & U/Liman Gangara/ L. E. A Gangara; U. Madaki I/ Ung. Madaki; U/Beti Tsabtawa I & II/ L. E. A U/Beti Tsabtawa; Ung. Madaki & U/Madaki Gangara (Gulbala)/ L. E. A Primary School; Muje Dawa Gari/ L. E. A Muje Dawa G.; Layin Sarkin I, II M/Yakawada/ L. E. A Primary School; Ung. Nasarawa/ Nasarawa; Ung. Sarkin Madara I, II/ L. E. A Primary School; Kago I, II & Rugoji I, II/ Kago & Rugoji; U/Baraje I, II & U/Magaji Bomawa/ Ung. Baraje; Sabon Gida Yaron Baba I, II/ Sabon Gida; S/Layin Madara I, II/ L. E. A S/Layi Madara; Ung. Rimi/ Kofar Mai Ungwa; Ung. Dutse/ Kofar Gidado Mai Ung.; Ung Bala Kofar Gidan Mai Ung.
Giwa	Shika	Shika Gari I, II, III/ Model School Shika; Hayin Gada I, II/ Hayin Gada; Hayin Gimba I/ Hayin Gimba; S/Layi Shika I, II, III/ S/Layi Shika; Ung. Katsinawa/ Ung. Katsinawa; Mshuts G. M. D./Nata'ala/ Mahita/Nata'ala; Guga Gari I, II, III/ Guga Gari; Guga Gari IV/ Guga Gari IV; Gobirawa U/Liman/ Gobirawa U/Liman; Salanke & U. Maude/ Salanke U/Maude; Tsibiri I, II, III & U/Jola U/Iya/ Tsibiri, U/Jola, U/Iya; Tawatsu Jabawa/ Tawatsu Jabawa; Ung. Nasarawa Buhari/ Nasarawa Buhari; Hayin Gimba II/ Hayin Gimba; Sabon Layin Shika/ Sabon Layin Shika
Giwa	Danmahawayi	Danmahawayi I, II/ Dispensary Hospital D/Mahawayi; Ung. Ganuwa I, II/ L. E. A Ung. Ganuwa; Kuringa I, II & Jangefe I, II/ L. E. A Ung. Ganuwa; Maje & Guga Maje Gari I, II/ L. E. A Maje; Ung. Sarki Tasha I, II & U/Magaji Maje/ Kofar Sarkin Gari; Ung. Karfe I, II/ Kofar Sarkin Gari; Madubi I, II/ L. E. A Madobi; Ung./Waziri I & II/ Ung./Waziri
Giwa	Yakawada	Ung. Sarkin Yakawada I, II, III/ Ung. Sarki; Ung. Sarkin Pada Yakawada I/ Ung. Sarkin Pada; Ung. Sanda I, II, III/ Ung. Sanda; Ung. Gaga I, II/ Ung. Gaga; Ung. Bature I, II, III/ Ung. Bature; Ung. Baketsari I, II, III & Nasarawa I, II/ Ung. Barcbaki; Ung. Pa I,/ Ung Pa & U/Syahaya; U/Maidoki/ U/Maidoki; Dokan Waziri I, II, III/ Dokan Waziri; Tsaunin Mayau/ Tsaunin Mayau; Gadagau Gari & S/Layi Gadagau I, II/ Gadagau Gari; Ung. Madaki Kawo/ Ung. Madaki Kawo; Ung. Gardawa I, II & Ung. Gwazodawa I, II/ U/Garahima U/Gwandawa; Ung. Sarkin Yakawada II/ Kofar Gidan M. Ung; Ung. Dan Galadima/ Kofar Maiunguwa; Ung. Kanwa/ Kofar Maiunguwa; U/S Yahaya II/ U/S Yahaya; Tashan Labbo/ Kofar Maiunguwa
Giwa	Idasu	Ung. S. Fatika I, II/ L. E. A Fatika; Idasu Gari I, II, III/ L. E. A Idasu; Ung. S. Fada Idasu I, II, III/ Kofar Gidan Maiunguwa; Tudun Batero I, II, & Kaza I, II/ Kofar Gidan Maiunguwa; Kafada/Dako/ Kofar Maiunguwa; U/Liman I, II & U/Zoko Kaya/ L. E. A Kaya; U/Gambo Madaki I, II & U/Madali Kaya/ Viewing Centre, Kaya; Ung. Barau Ma'aika/ Kofar Gidan S. Tasha; Kagara I, II/ Bakin Hanya; Ung. Shuaibu Jibrin I, II/ Kofar Maiunguwa; Marke/ Kofa Gidan Maiunguwa; Mugaba/ Kofa Gidan Maiunguwa; Rufewa/ Kofa Gidan Maiunguwa; Ung. Kumbawa/ Kofar Gidan Mai Ung.
Giwa	Kidandan	Kidandam I-V/ Viewing Centre, Kidandam; Ung. Nakaka I, II, U/Malam Nakowa S/Layi/ Kofar Maiunguwa; Ung. Dan Zango I, II & U/Gogi I, II, III/ Kofar Maiunguwa; Tumburku I, II/ Kofar Maiunguwa Tumburku; Basurfe M. Rikwa/ Kofar Maiunguwa Basurfe; Gidan Dutse I, II/ Kofar Maiunguwa G/Dutse; Ung. Rogo/ Kofar Gidan Maiunguwa; Sabon Sara Barden Baka/ Kofar Maiunguwa S/Sara; Maidauro I, II/ Kofar Maiunguwa; Toroko/ Kofar Maiunguwa; Kumfa I, II/ Kofar Mainguwa; Iyatawa I, II & Ang. S/Pada/ L. E. A. Iyatawa; Iyatawa I, II & Ang. S/Pada/ Kofar Mai Unguwa Tanimu; Hayin Mallam/ Kofar Maiunguwa; Barnawa/ Ringim/ Barnawa Kofar Maiunguwa; Hayin Fulani/ Viewing Centre Kidandan
Giwa	Galadimawa	Galadimawa I/ Kofar Gida Abdulawa; Galadimawa II/ Kofar Gidan Sarki; Galadimawa III/ Tunburku Maje; Mai Doki Village/ Kofar Maiunguwa; Gwadawa (Madugun Kwalfi)/ Kofar Maiunguwa Madagun Kwarfi; Rafin Sarki I/ Kofar Alh. Bala; Rafin Sarki II/ Kofar Gidan Mai Ung.; Gwandawa/ Kofar Gidan Mai Ung.
Giwa	Kadage	U/Sarkin Kadage I & U/Rinji I, II/ U/Sarkin Kadage; U/Alhaji Barau & Tudun Amadi/ U/Alhaji Barau; Karau Karau/ Karau Karau; Tabobi U/Fulani I, II, III/ Tabobi U/Fulani; Murai I, II/ Murai; Wazata I, II/ Wazata; Kundun Rafin Gora & Rafin Gora/ Kundun Rafin Gora; Daitu I, II/ Daitu; Haben Yandallah/ Kofar Gidan Alh. Ado; Fadan Karau Karau/ Kofar Gidan Mai Ung.
Giwa	Pan Hauya	Pan Hauya Gari I, II, III/ Pan Hauya Gari; U/Y/ Sarki I, II & U/Soyaki I, II/ U/Y. Sarki; U/Garuba Ali & U/Tata, Gangare I, II/ U/ Garuba Ali; Biye Gari I & Gungurfa/ Biye Gari; Bijimi I, II & Rafin Gora/ Bijimi; Rafin Yashi/ Rafin Yashi; Tsauni Gidan Tanko/ Gidan Tanko Saude; Biye II/ Binin Bako; Pan Hauya Gari II & III/ Pan Hauya Gari
Igabi	Turunku	Turunku Tsohuwa; Turunku Sabuwa; Amana Madachi; Gidan Gajilo; Ung. Galadima; Amana Kasuwa; Ibada I; Ung. Buwa Makaranta; Ung. Kurma; Babban Rafi; Dutse Mai; Kan Kurmi; Ung. Shekare; Kofoto; Doka; Ung. Liman I; Ung. Liman II; Turunku Makaranta; Ung. Mallam Chindo; Ung. Kurma II; Ibada II; Ung. Gimba; Farakwai I; Farakwai II; Farakwai Gari; Tsohuwar Kwana; Chirintawa; Hura; Ung. Jabbo; Farakwai III; Ung. Madaki I; Gargai I; Ung. Mallam Maku; Ung. Madaki II; Ung. Sarkin Bargu; Ung. Bakko I; Ung. Bakko II; Gargai II; Ung. Mai Unguwa D./Ma; Amana Kasuwa II; Turunku Sabuwa II
Igabi	Zangon Aya	Ung. Sarki I; Ung. Sarki II; Ung. Liman; Ung. Fadiya; Ung. Makama; Ung. Makera; Ung. Shehu I; Ung. Shehu II; K/Zango I; K/Zango II; Lambar Zango I; Lambar Zango II; Ung. Magaji; K/Tsutsunwa; Fangurzan; Ung. Harande; Mangi; Rifita; Kigo I; Kigo II; Tundun Wada Mangi; Ung. Sarki Dunbi; Audi Gari; Siddi I; Siddi II; Iruga Gari; Iruga Kasuwa; Ung. Kure; Baushe; Farda Gari; Ung. Liman Farda; Kwaru; Buzu; Ung. Dantsoho Waziri; Dawaki; Damari; Rifita II
Igabi	Gwaraji	Gwaraji I; Gwaraji II; Girku; Ung. Dadi Girku; Ung. Turaki; Wuji; Rubu; Ung. Gwari; Wusar I; Wusar II; Ung. Paiko; Bikaratu; Ung. Balele; Ung. Baka (Tarno); Bango I; Bango II; Kaban I; Kaban II; Maje; Joga I; Madatai; Barkonu; Girkawa; Joga II; Kaban III
Igabi	Birnin Yero	Birnin Yero Gari; Danbaba; Ung. Madaki; Dan Dami; Kargo; Sanhu; Kanzaure; Dibo; Jama'a Kargo; Kamfanin Pate I; Kamfanin Pate II; Fadan Sarki Jaji; Jaji I; Jaji II; Jaji III; Bela; Nasi I; Nasi II; C. S. C. I; C. S. C. II; C. S. C III; 35 Bn I; 35 Bn II; Labar I; Labar II; Nasarawa Labar; Sabon Yelwa; Ung. Galadima; Ung. Hassan; Labar III
Igabi	Igabi	Kempa; Ung. Waziri; Ung. Makaranta; Ung. Damo; Ung. Tsanyawa; Ung. Lado; Ung. Galadima; Ung. Dalhatu; Ung. Abara; Ung. Shuaibu; Ung. Kurmi Audu; Ung. Sarki Fada; Ung. Madaki; Ung. Wakili; Ung. Maiwada; Ung. Soro; Ung. Bayi R/Tsiwa; Ung. Kadashi; Ung. Bakin Kasuwa; Ung. Sarki; Ung. Sheka; Ung. Kwankwama; Ung. Sarauni; Ung. Ribisa; Ung. Liman; Ung. Likarbu; Ung. Yusuf Nadabo; Ung. Magayaki; Ung. Makama; Ung. Jigiro; Ung. Bai; Ung. Laye; Ung. Birnin Barwa; Ung. Mashekari; Ung. Maidodo; Sabon Gari Igabi; Abara II
Igabi	Rigachikun	Danmasani Road; N. T. I.; Malali; Gosoro; Barkallahu; Sabon Gari Rigachikun I; Sabon Gari Rigachikun II; L. E. A. Tundun Wada Rigachikun; Tsohon Gari Rigachikun I; Tsohon Gari Rigachikun II; Tsohon Gari Rigachikun III; Tudun Wada Rigachikun I; Tudun Wada Rigachikun II; Ung. Yohanna; N. A. F. I; N. A. F. II; N. A. F. III; S/F Road Rigachikun; Sabon Gari Rigachikun; Women's Centre; N. E. T. C.; Ung. Sarkin Jatau; Zaure I; Zaure II; Zaure III; Matakale; Namaje; Ung. Mai Wada; Likora; Ung. Magaji; Sabon Gari; Ung. Tudu; Ung. Galadima; Ung. Kudu; Ung. Mashigi; Ung. Madaki; Kahuta; Sabon Gari Rigachikun III; G. R. A. Gidin Rimi; N. A. F. IV; Danmasani Road II; Ung. Sarkin Jatau II
Igabi	Afaka	Afaka; Gidan Sarki I; Gidan Sarki II; Kutungare; Chikaji; Ung. Liman I; Ung. Liman II; Kwarakwara; Mando I; Mando II; Mahuta; Kauya Sabon Gari; Dalwa; Makaranta I; Makaranta II; B/Gangare; Ung. Liman; Sarkin Fauta; Rubu; Chidawaki; Riyawa; Afira; Jabanga; Kwazaro; Afaka II
Igabi	Sabon Birnin Daji	Tami; Runji; Rahama; Ung. Magaji/ Majidadi; Rikau; Makera; Sabon Birnin Daji; Dakau; Kabau Bawa; Baka; Gatari; Kwarakwara; Kajin Jiri; Bakin Kasuwa; Akwato; Jura; Ung. Makama Rusani; Kawara; Wusono; Dallatu; Kyauro; Ung. Madaki; Sharu; Kafin Sani; Ung. Makaddas; Tasha Wusono; Jura II
Igabi	Kerawa	Akwato; Karshi; Ung. Boyi; Kafin Iwa; Bakin Kasuwa; Kurmin Mallam; Marachi; Ung. Kerawa; Ung. Makama; Ung. Najaja; Sarkin Kerawa; Ung. Baka; Ung. Damina; Ung. Atiku; Gwada I; Gwada II; Bina; S/B Dosa; Dunki I; Dunki II; Dunki III; Ung. Makama I; Ung. Makama II; Bina II
Igabi	Kwarau	Sarkin Kwarau I; Sarkin Kwarau II; Ung. Liman; Kwarau Tasha I; Kwarau Tasha II; S/Gidan Abala I; S/Gidan Abala II; Ung. Shagoji; Ung. Sarkin Noma; Mazadu; Makera I; Makera II; Ung. Maraba; Ung. Liman I; Ung. Liman II; Ung. Babajo I; Ung. Babajo II; Rigachikun Road; Kafin Gwari; Ung. Dankande; Ung. Gwari; Babban Gada I; Babban Gida II; Ung. Ja'afaru; Ung. Chikaji; Ung. Sokwatawa; Rihogi I; Rihogi II; Rihogi III; Kwarau Tasha III
Igabi	Gadan Gayan	Ung. Lalle; Ung. Umar; Kwankwani; Hura; Ung. Banbayi; Kudansa; Ung. Waziri; Ung. Ahmadu I; Panturawa; Rikoka; Kabuwa; Panshanu I; Panshanu II; Ribako; Nagwari; Ung. Bawa; Sokwatawa; Ung. Ja'afaru; Ung. Ahmadu II; Filin Kwallo; Kan Kwana; Ribako II
Igabi	Rigasa	Sadau; Makaranta I; Ung. Sarki Rigasa I; Ung. Sarki Rigasa II; Abuja Road; Ung. Sarkin Mashi; Ung. Sarkin Kabilu I; Ung. Sarki Kabilu II; Ung. Kwate; Ung. Waziri; Last Bus Stop Adarawa; Ung. Dan Madami; Ung. Dauda; Ung. Mashi Gwari I; Ung. Mashi Gwari II; Zage-Zagi; Miyatti Allah I; Zage-Zagi II; Ung. Kudu; Miyatti Allah II; H/Dan Madami I; H/Dan Madami II; Hayin Taro-Taro; Kudandan; Ung. Ali Abuja Road; Ung. Danmadami II
Ikara	Ikara	Ung. Waziri I/ Central Primary School; Ung. Waziri II/ Central Primary School; Sabon Gari/ Local Govt. Car Park; Ung. Majidadi/ K/Abubakar Primary; Ung. Makama I/ Near K/Gidan Maianguwa; Ung. Makama II/ Near K/Gidan Maianguwa; Ung. Makama III/ Near K/Gidan Maianguwa; Ung. Ahmadu Dogo/ Primary School; Hayin Magina I/ Reading Room; Hayin Magina II/ Reading Room; Ung. Nuhu/ Primary School; Ung. Akawu/ M/Abubakar Primary; Ung. Magajin Gari I/ Near K/Gidan Maianguwa; Ung. Magajin Gari II/ Near K/Gidan Maianguwa; Ung. Magajin Gari III/ Asibitin K/Sambo; Kwasallawa/ Near K/Gidan Maianguwa; Ung. Isah/ Primary School; G. R. A./ State Secretariat; Auchanawa/ Primary School; Zage-Zagi/ Primary School; Ung. Kanawa/ Near K/Gidan Maianguwa; Ung. Liman/ Primary School; Ung. Bakoshi/ Near K/Gidan Maianguwa; Kankanki/ Primary School; Ung. Waziri/ Primary School; Ung. Katsalle/ Near K/Gidan Maianguwa; Ung. Badamasi/ Near K/Gidan Maianguwa; Ung. Gabas/ Primary School; Ung. Magajin Gari IV/ Near K/Gidan Maianguwa
Ikara	Janfala	Janfalan/ Primary School; Ung. Kartau/ Primary School; Ung. Danladi/ K/Maianguwa; Ung. Rimi/ Near K/Maianguwa; Charikan Malamai/ Primary School; Ung. Tanko/ Near K/Maianguwa; Ung. Mairiga/ Near K/Maianguwa; Jibis Gari/ Primary School; Ung. Makama/ Primary School; Ung. Galadima/ Primary School; Ung. Turaki/ Near K/Maianguwa; Hayin Tura/ Near K/Maianguwa; Ung. Bakula/ Near K/Maianguwa; Malikanchi I/ Primary School; Malikanchi II/ Primary School; Gimbawa/ Primary School; Asakale/ Near K/Maianguwa; Ung. Shawai/ Primary School; Ung. Korau/ Near K/Maianguwa; Ung. Liman/ Near K/Maianguwa; Malikanchi III/ Primary School; Ung. Galadima II/ Primary School
Ikara	K/Kogi	Kurmin Kogi I/ Primary School; Kurmin Kogi II/ Primary School; Ung. Magajin Gari/ Near K/Maianguwa; Ung. Zangi/ Primary School; Nakande/ Near K/Maianguwa; Garin Barau/ Primary School; Ung. Namama/ Near K/Maianguwa; Rafin Tabo/ Primary School; Ung. Rufa'I/ Near K/Maianguwa; Danlawal/ Primary School; Ung. Makama/ Primary School; Ung. Galadima/ Near K/Maianguwa; Ung. Turaki/ Primary School; Dokoki/ Primary School; Koda-Gora/ Primary School; Ung. Liman/ Near K/Maianguwa; Kwankwani/ Near K/Maianguwa; Ung. Chiroma/ Near K/Maianguwa; Furana/ Primary School; Ung. Tanko/ Primary School; Ung. S/Fada/ Primary School; Mahangi/ Primary School; Ung. S/Huda/ Primary School; Ung. Buwayi/ Near K/Maianguwa; Rafin Tabo II/ Primary School
Ikara	Saulawa	Saulawa Gari I/ Primary School; Saulawa South/ Near K/Maianguwa; Saulawa North/ Primary School; Saulawa Gari II/ Adult Edc. Class; Tsauni Miki/ Primary School; Ung. Lumu/ Near K/Maianguwa; Fadamar Kale East/ Primary School; Fadamar Kale West/ Primary School; Gidan M/Dansabe/ Near K/Maianguwa; Janmarmara/ Near K/Maianguwa; Kwari I/ Primary School; Kwari II/ Dispensary Kwari; Ung. Ibrahim/ Near K/Maianguwa; Ung. Dogo/ Near K/Maianguwa; Pampaida/ Primary School; Makera T. Labi/ Primary School; Mafera/ Primary School; Saulawa North II/ Primary School
Ikara	Pala	Pala South I/ Primary School; Pala North II/ Primary School; Ung. Mahuta/ Primary School; Ung. Tanko/ Near K/Maianguwa; Ung. Dogara/ Primary School; Ung. Gani/ Primary School; Pansamu/ Primary School; Ung. Galadima/ Near K/Maianguwa; Chara/ Primary School; Ung. Sallah/ Near K/Maianguwa; Tashar Dogo/ Near K/Maianguwa; Kawuri/ Primary School; Ung. Sarki/ Near K/Maianguwa; Ung. Liman/ Primary School; Pala North III/ Primary School
Ikara	Saya-Saya	Saya-Saya I/ Primary School; Saya-Saya II/ Dispensary; Gunduma Gari/ Primary School; Gunduma Hayin Gada/ Primary School; Ung. Turfi I/ Primary School; Makurdi/ Primary School; Bareda/ Near K/Maianguwa; Yelwa/ Primary School; Ung. Maigwado/ Near K/Maianguwa; Gargo/ Near K/Maianguwa; Ung. Kar/ Near K/Maianguwa; Kurmin Jau/ Near K/Maianguwa; Bunsura/ Near K/Maianguwa; Dogon Daji/ Near K/Maianguwa; Ung. Turfi II/ Primary School
Ikara	Auchan	Auchan I/ Primary School; Auchan II/ Primary School; Auchan III/ Primary School; S/Gari I/ Primary School; S/Gari II/ Primary School; Kwakwa I/ Primary School; Kwakwa II/ Primary School; Ung. Danlami/ Primary School; Ung. Audi/ Near K/Maianguwa; Ung. Rumbuna/ Near K/Maianguwa; Auchan K/Gabas/ Primary School; Allah Gaba I/ Primary School; Allah Gaba II/ Primary School; Ung. Mahuta/ Near K/Maianguwa; Ung. Chiroma/ Near K/Maianguwa; Allah Gaba III/ Primary School; Auchan IV/ Primary School; Auchan V/ Primary School; Ung. Rumbuna II/ Near K/Maianguwa; Ung. Lungu Auchan Hayi/Near K/Maianguwa; Ung Korofi Anuchan Hayi/Near K/Mai Anguwa; Ung. Mai Alewa/Near K/Mai Anguwa
Ikara	Rumi	Ung. Sarki Rumi I/ Primary School; Ung. Sarki Rumi II/ Primary School; Makera/ Near K/Maianguwa; Ung. Mamuda/ Near K/Maianguwa; Rafin Roga/ Near K/Maianguwa; Wambai I/ Near K/Maianguwa; Wambai II/ Near K/Maianguwa; Ung. Duka/ Near K/Maianguwa; Yauran I/ Primary School; Yauran II/ Primary School; Shadauro/ Near K/Maianguwa; Ung. Bala/ Primary School; Ung. Liman/ Near K/Maianguwa; Ung. Murtala/ Near K/Maianguwa; Ung. Halliru/ Primary School; Ung. Kwabe/ Near K/Maianguwa; Ung. Karo/ Near K/Maianguwa; Ung. Agalawa/ Near K/Maianguwa; Ung. Sarki Rumi III/ Primary School
Ikara	Paki	Fada I/ Clinic; Fada II/ Clinic; Ung. Arewa/ Near K/Maianguwa; Balbelu/ Near K/Maianguwa; Kofar Gabas I/ Primary School; Kofar Gabas II/ Primary School; Rariyar Daurawa/ Near K/Maianguwa; Kofar Kudu/ Primary School; Ung. Waziri/ Near K/Maianguwa; Ung. Nalado/ Primary School; Mairatata/ Dispensary; Yalwan Daji/ Primary School; Ung. Ahmadu/ Near K/Maianguwa; Ung. Fulani/ Near K/Maianguwa; Kofar Gabas III/ Primary School
Ikara	Kuya	Kuya Gari/ Primary School; Ung. Arewa Kuya/ Near K/Maianguwa; Babban Saura/ Primary School; Hayin Kuya/ Near K/Maianguwa; Ung. Ango/ Primary School; Tashan Nabai/ Primary School; Bamuyayi/ Near K/Maianguwa; Ung. Galadima/ Primary School; Dogon Juri/ Near K/Maianguwa; Gangarida Kwari/ Primary School; Gangarida I/ Primary School; Gangarida II/ Primary School; Ung. Saida/ Near K/Maianguwa; Ung. M. Yako/ Near K/Maianguwa; Ung. Sada/ Near K/Maianguwa; Kuya Gari II/ Primary School
Jaba	Nduyah	Ung. Sarkin Ankung/ Primary School; Ung. Ramindop/ Primary School; Ung. Madaki/ K/Gidan Sarki; Ung. Gora I/ K/Gidan Sarki; Ung. Taime/ K/Gidan Sarki; Ung. Indofa/ K/Gidan Sarki; Ung. Idar/ K/Gidan Sarki; Ung. R/Dop Kurah/ K/Gidan Sarki; Ung. Sarkin Aukung II/ K/Gidan Sarki; Ung. Gora II/ K/Gidan Sarki II
Jaba	Sambam	Ung. Zuma I/ K/Gidan Mai Ung. I; Ung. Samban Gida I/ K/Gidan Sarki; Ung. Samban Gida II/ Kofar Mai Ung.; Ung. Makama/ Kofar Mai Ung.; Ung. Loko 1a/ Kofar Mai Ung. I; Ung. S/Samban Daji/ Kofar Mai Ung.; Ung. Madaki/ K/Gidan Madaki; Ung. Sarkin Angwal I/ K/Sarki Angwal; Ung. Sarkin Angwal II/ K/Gidan Madaki; Ung. Loko II/ K/Gidan Mai Ung.; Ung. Sarkin Noma/ K/Sarkin Noma; Ung. S/Angwal III/ K/Gidan Sarki; Ung. Sarkin Loko 1b/ Mai Ung. II; Ung. Sarkin II/ K/Mai Ung. II
Jaba	Fada	Ung. Galadima 1a/ K/Galadima 1a; Ung. Galadima II/ K/Gidan Galadima II; Ung. Chere I/ K/Gidan Chere; Old Market Square(Ung. Shere II Kagoro, Ube P/S Fogyie); Town Hall/ Near Town Hall; Ung. T/Wada/ K/Gidan Maianguwa; Ung. Bubat/ K/Gidan Maianguwa; Ung. Ahmadu Yere/ K/Gidan Dakace; Ung. Dauda/ K/Gidan Dauda; Ung. Yebang/ K/Gidan Yebang; Ung. Adakye/ K/Gidan Adakye; Ung. Galadima 1b/ K/Gidan Galadima 1b
Jaba	Sabchem	Ung. Turawa I/ Primary School Maude; Ung. Turawa II/ Post Office; Bakin Kasuwa/ K/Gidan S/Kasuwa; Ung. Madugu/ K/Gidan Daniel; Ung. Garsu/ Fascom Office; Ung. S/Gari I/ K/Gidan Maianguwa; Ung. Haruna Yem I/ K/Gidan Haruna I; Ung. S/Gari II/ K/Gidan Maianguwa; Ung. Haruna Yem II/ K/Gidan Haruna II; Ung. Yem Dasaro/ K/Gidan Yem
Jaba	Sabzuro	Ung. Yeh-Yock I/ K/Gidan Yeh-Yock; Ung. Ngar-Koni/ K/Gidan Maianguwa; Ung. Yaki Jatau/ K/Gidan Yaki Jatau; Ung. Shanono/ K/Gidan Maianguwa; Ung. Dan Munci/ Primary School; Ung Iliya Kumdangbo K/Gidan Iliya Gaiya; Ung. Yeh-Yock II/ K/Gidan Yeh-Yock II
Jaba	Dura/Bitaro	Ung. Gaiya/ K/Gidan Gaiya; Ung. Sarkin Dura I/ K/Gidan Sarki I; Ung. Diddem/ K/Gidan Sarki; Ung. Rana/ K/Gidan Maianguwa; Ung. S/Bitaro/ K/Gidan Sarkin Bitaro; Ung Madakin Bitaro/ K/Gidan Madakin Bitaro; Ung. S/Dura II/ K/Gidan S/Dura II
Jaba	Daddu	Ung. S/Kuryas A1/ Ung. Sarki I; Ung. S/Kuryas 2a/ Ung. Sarki I; Ung. Daddawa/ Ung. Sarki; Ung. Kyari/ Ung. Sarki; Gidan Sani/ Ung. Sarki; Ung. Karshi/ Ung. Sarki; Ung. Tsakiya/ Ung. S/Tsakiya; Ung. Kurmin Kwara/ K/Gidan Sarki; Ung. Kurmin Zomo/ K/Gidan Sarki; Ung. Rana/ Primary School; Ung. Danyandang/ Primary School; Ung. Kajuru/ K/Gidan Dakache; Ung. Kugyama/ K/Gidan Dakache; Ung. S/Kuryas A2/ K/Gidan; Ung. Sarkin Kuryas 2b/ K/Gidan Sarki II
Jaba	Chori	Ung. Katuka/ K/Gidan Sarki; Ung. Dauji/Tsauni/ K/Gidan Maianguwa I; Ung. Buwarye/ K/Gidan Maianguwa; Ung. Baraki/ Primary School; Ung. Galadima I/ K/Gidan Maianguwa II; Ung. Fadeik/ Primary School; Ung. Makama/ K/Gidan Makama; Ung. Arzuka/ K/Gidan Sarki; Ung. Makama Chiroma/ K/Gidan Chiroma; Ung. Sarkin Fadeik/ K/Gidan Sarki; Ung. Dauji/Tsauni II/ K/Gidan Maianguwa II; Ung. Galadima II/ K/Gidan Galadima II
Jaba	Nok	Ung. Tunga Nok/ K/Gidan Sarki; Ung. Makama I/ K/Gidan Makama I; Ung. Zeeh/ K/Gidan Sarki; Ung. Wane Turaki/ K/Gidan Sarki; Ung. Dodo/ K/Gidan Sarki; Ung. Yari/ K/Gidan Sarki; Ung. Sabon Gari/ K/Gidan Sarki; Ung. Makama II/ K/Gidan Makama II
Jaba	Fai	Ung. Sarki Fai 1a/ K/Gidan Sarki I; Ung. Sarkin Fai 2a/ K/Gidan Sarki I; Ung. Sarkin Sabo I/ K/Gidan Sarki; Ung. Sarkin Sabo II/ K/Gidan Sarki; Ung. Kurmin Bauna/ K/Gidan Sarki; Ung. Fari/ Primary School; Ung. Sarkin K/Jatau I/ K/Gidan Sarki; Ung. Sarkin K/Jatau II/ K/Gidan Sarki; Ung. Madaki/ K/Gidan Maianguwa; Ung. Sanyi/ K/Gidan Maianguwa; Ung. Isah/Gauji/ K/Gidan Sarki; Ung. Madaki Fai/ K/Gidan Madaki; Ung. Galadima/Gauji/ K/Gidan Galadima; Ung. Sarkin Fai 1b/ K/Gidan Sarki II; Gdss Fai (Ung. Sarki Fai Iib, Ube P/S Kurmin Rumi)
Jema'a	Kafanchan 'A'	Magajin Gari/ Palace Road Lg/Rest House; Sarkin Kasuwa/ Rumada; Ung. Mai Ango/ Abuja St. (Cinema House); Ung. Sule Sawaba/ Kofar Sawaba; Ung. Kwarbai I./ Bauchi/ Jagindi St.; Kwarbai II/ Baba Emeka; Ung. Ubandoma/ Sokoto St.; Ung. Alh. Sani Tela/ Jagindi St.; Ung. Block Industry/ Gdss Road (Block Industry); Ung. Ikani/ Hayin Gada (Sol & Co); Labaran Sa'I/ School Road; Ung. Abdu Azan/ Bauchi St.; Ma'aji Baba Moh'D./ Jema'a St.; Sarkin Daji/ Magajiya St.; Abdulmajid/ Ibadan St.; Marafa/ Warri St.; Calabar/ Calabar St.; Naibi/ Borno St.; Iyan Jema'a/ Kofar Musa Dona
Jema'a	Kafanchan 'B'	Ung. Zailani/ Sokoto St.; Kofar Tangalashi I./ Kastina St.; Kofar Tangalashi II./ Kofar Audu Barau; Inusa Mai Fenti/ Bauchi St.; Kofar Ladodo/ Kaduna St.; Dagachi Danmainono/ Sokoto/Danhaya St.; Dan Mai Kosa/ Ibadan St.; Dan Azumi/ Zaria St.; Audu Asha'O/ Funtua St.; Tashan U/Rimi/ Hadeja St.; Court II/ Motor Park; Ung. Shehu/ Magajiya St.; Musa Ilalla/ Zaria St.; Bakin Kogi II./ Hospital Area; Barau Mai Unguwa/ Soba St.; Ung. Yahaya/ Kaduna St.; Sule Barau/ Bauchi St.; Musa Dan Yaro/ Kano St.; Kofar Wada/ Ilorin/Kano St.
Jema'a	Maigizo 'A'	Ung. Sarkin Maigizo/ Ung. S/Maigizo; Prac. Pry. Sch. Kaf I./ Prac. Pry. Sch. Kaf I.; Lowcost Houses I./ Lowcost Houses I.; Sarkin Aduiwan I./ Ung. Namadi; Railway Station I./ Railway Station I.; Railway Station II./ Railway Institute; Ung. Umaru Zikpak/ Ung. Umaru Zikpak; Mamuda Loko 'B'/ Mamuda Loko 'B'; Aduwan II./ Dagachi Isa; Ung. Masara/ L. E. A. Ung. Masara; Ung. Jogada/ Kofar Atuk; Ung. Ma'adam/ Ung. Sheyin
Jema'a	Kaninkon	Ung. Madaki (Baki)/ Ung. Madaki; Ung. Baki (S/Gari)/ Ung. Baki (S/Gari); Ung. Sarki U/Baki/ Ung. Sarki U/Baki; Ung. Fari I/ Ung. Fari I.; Ung. Fari II./ Ung. Fari II.; Ung. Mal. Tete/ Ung. Mal. Tete; Tudun Wada/ Tudun Wada; Yillabe/Ibrahim Dangoma/ Mai Damisa Dangoma I.; Ung. Madaki Dangoma II/ Mai Damisa Dangoma II.; Ambam I./ Ambam I.; Amere North/ Sarki S./ Ambam II.; Sarki M. B./ Kogi I & II/ Sarkin M. B./ Kogi; Madaki B/Kogi/R/Dadin Ambam/ Madaki B/Kogi; Madaki B/Kogi/R/Dadin Ambam/ B/Kogi Ambam II.; Galadima Goska/ Ung. Goska; Galadima Dangoma (Wunti)/ Dangoma Village Area; Tudun Wada Amere/ Amere T/Wada; Tudun Wada Amere II./ T/Wada Amere; Garti Gari/ Garti Gari; Magaji Amere South/ Ung. Magaji; Station U/Baki/ Ung. Baki; Fa'a Bakin Kogi/ Fa'a B/Kogi
Jema'a	Jagindi	Ung. Hausawa I./ Ung. Hausawa I.; Ung. Hausawa II./ Ung. Hausawa II.; Ung. Banauje/ Ung. Banauje; Kogom Tasha/ Kogom Tasha; Magaji (Dangwa)/ Magaji (Dangwa); Danlle I. (U/Agite)/ Danlle I. (U/Agite); Kariyo/ Kariyo; S/Jagindi I. (Tasha)/ S/Jagindi I. (Tasha); Ung. Bala/ Ung. Bala; Mai Ung. K./ Mai Ung. K.; Ung. Ninzam/ Ung. Ninzam; Ung. Kanwai/ Ung. Kanwai; Kogum Dutse/ Kogum Dutse; Ung. Nuhu/ Ung. Nuhu; Sarki Jagindi Gari/ Sarki Jagindi Gari; Dangwa Village/ Dangwa Village; Jagindi Tasha F/Station/ Jagindi Tasha F/Station; Ung. Mission/ Ung. Mission; Dalle II. S/Fada/ Dalle II. S/Fada; Ung. Maga Yaki J/Gari/ Ung. Maga Yaki J/Gari
Jema'a	Godogodo	Nindem I/ Kofar Dagachi; Nindem II/ Isiyaku Bahago; Fadan Hakimi I./ Fadan Hakimi I.; Fadan Hakimi II./ Fadan Hakimi II.; Hakimin Godogodo II./ Kofar Baba Ibrahim; Gwalkofa U/Gwamna/ Gwalkofa U/Gwamna; Gwalkofa II. U/Ibo/ Kofar Alh. Tofa; Arak I./ Hayin Gada; Arak II./ Andaha (Akwa); Ninte I./ Sarkin Ninte I.; Ninte II./ S/Zankan; Farin Hawa/ Farin Hawa; Sarki Arusuwa/ Kofar Atiku Labaran; Ung. Gwamna/ Ung. Gwamna; Ung. Anjo/ Ung. Anjo; Kibam/Sarki Abam Gari/ Sarkin Gari; Madaki Golkofa/ L. E. A. Pry. Sch.; Zankan Mante/ Sabo Mante; Angola U/Makera/ Angola U/Makera; Zankan U/Sarki/ Kofar Dagachin Zankan
Jema'a	Gidan Waya	Gidan Waya U/Sarki I./ Ung. Hausawa G/Waya; Gidan Waya U/Sarki II./ Gidan/ Waya II; Ung. Ninzam/ Ung. Ninzam Baiya; Dagachin Nisama I./ Dagachin Nisama I.; Dagachin Nisama II./ Dagachin Nisama II.; Kanufi I. Dagachi/ Dagachin Kanufi; Mailafiya I/ L. E. A. Pri. Sch. Mailafiya; Mile One/ Ung. Sarki; Mailafiya II/ Kofar Dagachi; Mailafiya III/ Kofar Ali; Mailafiya IV/ Ung. Mailafiya; Baiya/ Baiya; Karamin Gada/ Ung. Madaki; Dogon Fili/Dogon Fili; Denji/ Denji; Antan/ Kofar Dagachi; Shuwaka G/Waya/ Unguwan Shuwaka; Liman G/Waya/ Kofar Maji Dadi; Nimbia/ Nimbia
Jema'a	Atuku	Atukun Gada/ Ung. Madaki; Atukun Tozo/ Ung. Dagachi; Atukun Kasa/ Atukun Kasa L. E. A. Sch.; Atukun Kasa II/ Atukun Kasa II.; Sakiyo/ L. E. A. Sakiyo; Tafan Gida/ L. E. A. Tafan; Pasa Kwari/ L. E. A. Pasa Kwari; Tajak/ Tajak; Babban Gada/Barmo/ Barmo; Wakili/ L. E. A. U/Wakili; Daniel Bila/ Daniel Bila; Katsak/ Katsak; Tafan Ung. Yashim/ Yashim
Jema'a	Asso	Ung. Fada Asso I./ Ung. Fada Asso I.; Ung. Fada Asso II./ Ung. Fada Asso II.; Tanda Dogo/ Tanda Dogo; Galadima/ Galadima; Tanda Gajere/ Tanda Gajere; Fadan Wazo I./ Fadan Wazo I.; Fadan Wazo II./ Fadan Wazo II.; Madaki Wazo/ Madaki Wazo; Sarkin Kwagiri/ Sarkin Kwagiri; Kambai/ Kambai; Tsintsiya/ Tsintsiya; Bido Tsintsiya/ Bido Tsintsiya; Kurmin Zaki/ Kurmin Zaki; Sarki Kussum/ Sarki Kussum; Sarki Kussum II./ Sarki Kussum II.; Ung. Yuli/ Ung. Yuli; Fadan Achi Arage/ Fadan Achi Arage; Sarkin Mada Gabas/ Sarkin Mada Gabas; Wambai Mada Jatau/ Wambai Mada Jatau; Ung. Madaki/ Ung. Madaki; Sarki Kitti/ Sarki Kitti; Sarkin Garin Kwagiri/ Sarkin Garin Kwagiri
Jema'a	Bedde	Ung. S/Kwarabe/ Ung. S/Kwarabe; Ung. Fada Kwarabe/ Ung. Fada Kwarabe; Ung. Sarki Kanock I./ Ung. Sarki Kanock I.; Ung. Sarki Kanock II./ Ung. Sarki Kanock II.; Sarkin Bedde (Fada)/ Sarkin Bedde (Fada); Ung. Sarki Mai Biri/ Ung. Sarki Mai Biri; Turkpa/ Turkpa; Ramin-Dop/ Ramin-Dop; Ramin-Dop II./ Ramin-Dop II.; Yanda Bawa/ Yanda Bawa; Sarkin Kyayya I./ Sarkin Kyayya I.; Sarkin Kyayya II./ Sarkin Kyayya II.; Galadima Kyayya/ Galadima Kyayya; Magajin Gari Kyayya/ Magajin Gari Kyayya; Gigira Kyayya/ Gigira Kyayya; Sarkin Gabi I./ Sarkin Gabi I.; Sarkin Gabi II./ Sarkin II.; Mada Yamma/ Mada Yamma; Wambai Mada/ Wambai Mada; Njebi/ Njebi; Acca/ Acca; Gauta Sarki/ Gauta Sarki; Galadima Gauta/ Galadima Gauta
Jema'a	Kagoma	Ung. Fada I/ Ung. Fada I; Ung. Fada II/ Ung. Fada II; Ung. Fada III/ Ung. Fada III; Ung. Rana/ Ung. Rana; Ung. Madaki/ Ung. Madaki; Afana Kagoma/ Afana Kagoma; Sarkin Fido/ Sarkin Fido; Ung. Bara/ Ung. Bara; Sarkin Fori/ Sarkin Fori; Ung. Makama/ Ung. Makama; Paki I./S. Fido II./ L. E. A. Pry. Sch. Paki II.; Fada Kagoma Central/ Gwong Community Bank; Sarkin Fori II/ Sarkin Fori II; Paki II/ Paki II; Ngaskiya I. & II./ Ngaskiya I. & II.; Fulani Fori/ Fulani Fori
Jema'a	Takau 'B'	Ung. Mamuda Goni/ Ung. Mamuda Goni; Ung. Musa Kognet/ Ung. Musa Kognet; Ung. Musa Kognet II/ Ung. Musa Kognet II; Kanat Mutum/Ung. Markus/ Kanat Mutum/Ung. Markus; Ung. Sarkin Yashi/ Ung. Sarkin Yashi; Ung. Zamani/ Ung. Zamani; Low Cost Houses II. (U/Luka)/ Low Cost Houses II. (U/Luka); Prac. Pry. Sch. (Ung. Akau)/ Prac. Pry. Sch.(Ung. Akau); Dagachin Takau/ Dagachin Takau; Ung. Rago G. S. S./ Ung. Rago; G. G. S. S. Takau I./ G. G. S. S. Takau; Takau II./ L. E. A. Takau
Kachia	Agunu	Gadanaji/ L. E. A. Gadanaji; Ung. Dutse/ L. E. A. Ung. Dutse; Kuturu Rimi/ L. E. A. Kuturu Rimi; Grazing I/ G/Sarki Grazing; Katul/ L. E. A. Katul; Adage/ Pri. Sch. Adage; Gorah/ Pri. Sch. Gora; Sakwai/ L. E. A. Sabon Kaura; Sabon Kaura/ L. E. A. Sabon Kaura; Kurmin Biri I/ L. E. A. Kurmin Biri; Kurmin Biri II/ L. E. A. Katul Crossing; Agunu/ Gidan Audi; Antai/ L. E. A. Antai; Kasai/ Pri. Sch. Kasai; Unguwan Maigoro/ Kofar G/Sarki; Allah Magani/ Kofar G/Sarki; Grazing II/ L. E. A. Primary; Kurmin Biri III/ K/G Mai Unguwa
Kachia	Awon	Awon I/ L. E. A Pri. Sch. Awon; Awon II/ Gss Awon; Arikko/ G/Mai Ang. Kuka; Ung. Toka/ Pri. Sch. Toka; Kurmin Aja/ L. E. A Pri. Sch. K/Aja; Impi Kuturmi/ Ank./ Gidan Mai Anguwa; Impi Kadara/ Pri. Sch.; Kigwale/ Pri. Sch.; Koron Tsohuwa/ Pri. Sch.; Gidan Kaura/ Pri. Sch.; Tsakiya/ Pri. Sch.; Katon Bisa/ Pri. Sch.; Gora/ Pri. Sch.; An-Turu/ Pri. Sch.; Akwando/ Pri. Sch. Akwando; Akama/ L. E. A Pri. Sch. Akama; Akwana/ Lea Akwana; Igo/ Gidan Sarki Igo; Gidan Jagaba/ Lea Pri. Sch. G/Jagaba; Gidan Yaya/ G/Mai Unguwa; Barga/ Gidan Mai Unguwa; Anguwan Rimi/ Gidan Mai Unguwan; Kurmin Taba/ Kofar Mai Anguwa; Imfi Kadara/ K/G Mai Unguwan
Kachia	Doka	Doka I/ Lea Pri. Sch. Doka; Doka II/ G/Sarki; Akilibu I/ Pri. Sch. Akilibu; Akilibu II/ Kofar G/Sarki; Rijana I/ Health Centre; Sabon Maro/ Lea Sabon Maro; Gidan Busa/ Kofar G/Sarki; Ung. Pah/ Lea Pri. Sch. U/Pah; Gidan Kwasau/ Kofar Gidan Mai Anguwa; Chungula/ Kofar G/Sarki; Makama Gidan Duna/ Kofar Gidan Sarki; Gidan Mamman/ Kofar Gidan Sarki; Tiringa/ Lea Tiringa; Anfu I/ Kofar Gidan M/Anguwa; Anfu/Uju II/ K/G Maianguwa
Kachia	Gumel	Gumel I/ Lea Pri. Sch. Gumel; Kurmin Mazuga I & II/ Gidan Mai Anguwa; Dagwarga/ Lea Pri. Dagwarga; Kurmin Baba/ Lea Pri. K/Baba; Upper Secretariat/ Secretariat; Sakainu/ Kofar Gidan Sarki; Ika/ Lea Pri. Sch. Ika; Asako/ Lea Pri. Sch. Asako; Allo/ Pri. Sch. Allo; Wawan Rafi/ Lea Pri. W/Rafi; Sarahu/ Kofar G/Sarki; Kurmin Sara/ Lea Sch. K/Sara; Gumel II/ Gidan Mai Anguwa; Kurmin Sara II/ Kofar G/Sarki; Maho Faliya/ Lea Pri. Sch.; Kurmin Sara III/ K/G Maiunguwa
Kachia	Gidan Tagwai	Gidan Tagwai I/ Lea Sch. G/Tagwai; Gidan Tagwai II/ Gidan Sarki; Walijo I/ Lea Sch. Walijo; Dandan I/ Kofar Gidan Sarki; Yarbung I/ Govt. Sec. Sch. Yarbung; Yarbung II/ Lea Pri. Sch. Yarbung; Santai/ Lea Pri. Santai; Gidan Gyara/ Lea Pri. Sch. G./Gyara; Magajiram/ Lea Pri. Magajiram; Boham/ Kofar G/Sarki; Dandan II/ Kofan G/Sarki; Ung. Waziri/ Kofar G/Mai Anguwa; Magayaki/ Kofar G/Sarki; Sabon Gida/ Kofar G/Anguwa; Sabon Gari/ Kofar G/Mai Anguwa; Mari/ Kofar G/Mai Anguwa; Anguwan Wayo/ Kofar G/Mai Anguwa; Gidan Tagwai III/ K/G Maiunguwan; Magayaki II/ Lea Pri. Sch.
Kachia	Kwaturu	Kwaturu Usman/ Lea Pri. Sch.; Kwaturu Ungulu/ Kofar G/Sarki; Kurmin Mata/ Lea Pri. Sch.; Bahago/ Lea Pri. Sch.; Kudah/ Kofar G/Sarki; Kurmin Gwaza I/ Lea Pri. Sch.; Gantan/ Lea Pri. Sch.; Kurmin Sidi/ Lea Pri. Sch.; Mai Damishi/ Kofar G/Sarki; Ung. Waje/ Kofar G/Sarki; Kurmin Gyada/ Lea Pri. Sch.; K/Gwaza II/Ramin Kura/ Kofar G/Sarki; Ang. Tama/ Kofar G/Sarki; Gantan S/Gari/ Kofar G/Sarki; Ung. Pah/ Kofar G/Sarki; Kurmin Gyada II/ K/G Mai Unguwa
Kachia	Ankwa	Ankwa/ Pri. Sch. Ankwa; Pachi/ K/G/Sarki Pachi; Ung. Jibrin/ K/G/Sarki; Mai Ido Kufai/ Lea Pri. Sch.; Mai Ido Rafi/ Gidan Sarki; Aburon/ Gidan Sarki; Ung. Pah/ Kofar M/Anguwa; Yaji/ Gidan Sarki; Kasan Kogi/ Lea Kasan/Kogi; Ankwa Daji/ Kofar G/Sarki; Gidan Gizago/ Kofar G/Sarki; Banin Kanwa/ Kofar G/Sarki; Ankwa II/ Kofar G/Sarki; Anguwan Waziri/ Kofar G/M/Anguwan; Gabachua/ Gidan Sarki; Sabon Gida/ Gidan Sarki; Maido Rafi/ K/G Mai Unguwa
Kachia	Katari	Garin Katari/ Lea Pri. Sch.; Ung. Zamfarawa/ Kofar G/Sarki; Madaki Gari/ K/Gidan Sarki; Katambi/ Lea Katambi; Kututu/ Kofar G/Sarki; Kurmin Kare/ Kofar G/Sarki; Angwangwara/ Kofar G/Sarki; Badoko/ Lea Badoko; Gidan Maga/ K/Gidan Sarki; Gashi/ Kofar G/Sarki; G/Madaki/ Kofar G/Sarki; G/Magaji/ Kofar G/Sarki; Alili/ Kofar G/Sarki; Sarkin Kauye/ Kofar G/Sarki; Ung. Zamfara II/ K/G Maiunguwa
Kachia	Bishini	Bishini I/ Lea Bishini; Bishini II/ K/Gidan Sarki; Birya/ K/Gidan Sarki; Kurmin Iya/ Lea Pri. Sch.; Azara/ Lea Pri. Sch.; Nasarawa/ K/Gidan Sarki; Dudu/ K/Gidan Sarki; Ingili/ K/Gidan Sarki; Iddoh/ K/Gidan Sarki; Kwakare Tsoho/ K/Gidan Sarki; G/Duna/ K/Gidan Sarki; Ung. Hausawa Birya/ K/Gidan Sarki; Beji/ K/Gidan Sarki; Peni/ Lea Peni; Birya II/ K/Gidan Sarki; Kwakware Sabo/ K/G Sarki; Kurmin Iya II/ Lea Pri. Sch.
Kachia	Kachia Urban	Unguwan Gabas I/ Lea II Kachia; Unguwan Gabas II/ Kofar Gidan Alh. Tijjiani; Kusfa I/ Kofar G/Alh. Baban Yaro; Nasarawa/ Co-Operative Building; Unguwan Fada I/ Kofar G/Hakimi Kachia; Ung. Mahuta/ Kofar G/Sarki Pawa; Kwantaro I/ Kofar G/Alh. Magaji; Kwantaro II/ Kofar G/Ibrahim Na'amu; Katanga I/ Kofar G/Sarki Kachia; Madaka/ Lea I Kachia; Unguwan Yansanda/ Barrack; Gss Kachia/ Gss Kachia; Unguwan Baba/ Kofar Gidan Baba; Sabon Gari/ Kofar Gidan Baba M/Burodi; Unguwan Ate/ Lea Pri. Sch. U/Ate; Rehab/ Zonal Office; Jaudu/ Kofar Gidan Mai Anguwan; Kabode/ Kofar Gidan Sarki; Insame/ Kofar Gidan M/Anguwan; Itar/ Kofar Gidan M/Anguwan; Kusfa II/ Area Court I; Anguwan Fada II/ Kofar Gidan Sani Dodo; Katanga II/ T. V. Centre; Nasarawa II/ R. E. B. Centre; Mahuta II/ Kofar Gidan Na'Ibi; Madaka II/ Social Welfare; Sabon Gari II/ Kofar Gidan Alh. Tukur; Dispensary/ Tsohuwan Kasuwa; Kusfa III/ Area Court; Ung. Gabas III/ L. E. A. Kachia; Madaka III/ L. E. A. Kachia; Kwantaro III/ K/G Narawai
Kachia	Sabon Sarki	Sabon Sarki I/ Lea S/Sarki; Sabon Sarki II/ Gss S/Sarki; Kurmin Rimi/ Gss Jaban Kogo; Bursan/ Lea Hambori; Gidan Mana/ Pri. Sch. G/Mana; Kwagari Kaje/ Pri. Sch. G/Jibri; Pando/ Pri. Sch. Rikawan; Hambari/ Lea Pri. Sch. Gyani; Jaban Kogo I/ Gidan Sarki; Jaban Kogo II/ Gss Kurmin Musa; Kangiwa, Kangiwa; Kurmin Rimi/ Kofar Gidan Sarki
Kachia	Kurmin Musa	Gyani/ L. E. A. Pri. Sch.; Antong Tuna/ K/G Sarki; Kurmin Musa I/ L. E. A. Pri. Sch.; Benjock/ K/G Sarki; Rikuwan/ L. E. A. Pri. Sch.; Gidan Mai Kai/ K/G Sarki; Lokoga/ K/G Sarki; Sabon Mashi Dam I/ K/G Sarki; Kurmin Musa II/ L. E. A Pri. Sch.; Antong Gagara/ K/G Sarki; Gidan Jabir Primary School; Sabon Mashi Dam II/ K/G Sarki; Gyani II/ L. E. A. Pri. Sch.
Kaduna North	Shaba	Gombe Road/ Abg Centre; Nupe Road I/ Ibadan Street; Nupe Road II/ Shahen Hospital; Nupe Road III/ Scholarship Board Premises; Ibadan Street/ J. 11 Ibrahim Taiwo Road; Ibrahim Taiwo Road I/ B. 15 Ibrahim Taiwo Road; I/Taiwo Rd II/ People's Bank Branch Office; I/Taiwo Rd III/ Board Of Internal Revenue Office; Ibadan Street/ Ahmadu Bello Way; Kabba Road I/ D. 2 Kabba Road; Kabba Road II/ Emma Clinic; Kano/ Ahmadu Bello Way; Kano/Ibadan Street/ E. 1 Ibadan Street; Kano Road Extension/ Kano Road End; Bida Road I/ E. 10 Kano Road; Bida Road II/ Ee 10 Bida Road; Abeokuta Street I/ E. 11 Bida Road; Abeokute Road II/ Ee 13 Bida Road; Jos Road I/ G. 2 Jos Road; Jos Road II/ Ff 12 Jos Road; Jos Road III/ Jos Road End; Argungu Road I/ U. 2 Ibadan / Argungu Road; Argungu Road II/ Argungu Road Extension; Katsina Road I/ Pilgrim Welfare Board; Katsina Road II/ A. A. 11 Abeokuta Street; Katsina Road III/ Katsina/ Ibadan Street; Katsina/ Ahmadu Bello/ L. 8 Ahmadu Bello Way; Katsina Road III
Kaduna North	Gaji	Adamawa Road I/ Y. 3 Adamawa Road; Adamawa Road II/ L. T 10 Road; Zaria Road I/ No. 12 Zaria Road; Zaria Road II/ W. W. 6 Zaria Road; Gumel Road I/ T. T. 20 Gumel Road; Gumel Road II/ W. W. 15 Gumel Road; Ibadan St./ Zakari Isa Clinic; A. Z. 33 Daura/ Maiduguri Road; Daura Road I/ A. O. 18 Daura Road; Damaturu Road/ Bright Int. Sch. Damaturu; A. Z. 15 Bakori/ Prime Hospital; L. E. A. Maiduguri Road I; L. E. A. Maiduguri Road II; Oyo Road/ No 19 Oyo Road; Oshogbo/ Lagos Street; Forcados Road N. E. 9; Abubakar Kigo/ L. Govt. Secretariat; Abubakar Kigo II/ Council Chamber; Abubakar Kigo III/ Rehabilitation Board Gate; One Nigeria Hotel/ N. C 15 Muri Road; Oshogbo/ Abubakar Kigo Road; Keffi Road/ Lagos Street; L. E. A Lagos Street I; L. E. A. Lagos Street II; L. E. A. Muri Road I; L. E. A. Muri Road II; Jama'a/ Junction Road; Arochukwu/ Ibibio Road/ No. 15 Forcados Road; Abubakar Kigo/ L. E. A. Constitution Road; Abubakar Kigo/ G. D. S. S.; Ibibio Road/ No. 15 Forcados Road
Kaduna North	Unguwan Liman	L. E. A Katsina Road; Benue Road/ U. 12 Benue Road; Benue Road II/ A. J. 50 Benue Road; Zaria Road I/ A. J. 32 Zaria Road; Zaria Road II/ A. J. 15 Zaria Road; Yoruba Road I/ T. Z. Yoruba Road; Yoruba Road II/ A. K. 24 Yoruba Road; Wushishi Road I/ Ll. 12 Wushishi Road; Wushishi Road II/ A. K. 35 Wushishi Road; Wushishi Road III/ A. L. 29 Wushishi Road; Scala Cinema; Danmusa Road I/ T. Z. 203 Dan Musa Road; Danmusa Road II/ C. 35 Dan Musa Road; Danmusa Road/ 115 Oriakpta N/Extension; Abuja Road I/ A. L. 5 Abuja Road; Radar Cinema Gate I; Kazaure Road/ A. M. Kazaure Road; Bungudu Road/ Kajola Bread Office; Radar Cinema II/ 2nd Gate; Sardauna Crescent/ Railway Crossing Gate; Sardauna Crescent/ Children Welfare Office; Damask Road/ B. 28 Sardauna Crescent; Ogori Road/ B. 87 Ruma Road; Dange Road/Bz 79 Dange Road; Offa Road/ B. 27 Offa Road; Runka Road/ Prince College; Ruma Road II/ B. 9 Ruma Road; Ruma Road III/ 33/34 Oriakpta Mech.; Runka Road II; L. E. A. Katsina Road
Kaduna North	Maiburji	Katsina Road I/ Ksta Bus Stop; Katsina Road II/ Ag 11 Katsina Road; Gwandu Road I/ T. 1 Gwandu Road; Gwandu Road II/ No. 18 Gwandu Road; Jos Road I/ No. 9 Jos Road; Jos Road II/ No. 19 Jos Road/ Lagos Street; Jos Road III/ No. 20 Jos Road/ Lagos Street; Jos Road IV/ 005 Bayajida Street/ Jos Road; Jos Road V/ Af 1 Bayajida Street/ Jos Road; Kontagora Road I/ Q 19 Kontagora/A/Bello; Kontagora Road II/Ea 2 Kontagora/A/Bello; Kano Road I/ Kano Road/A/Bello Way Junction; Kano Road II/ Kano/ Hadejia No. 1; Kano Road/ Kabala Bus Stop/ Kano/ Kabala Bus Stop; Lagos Street/ Ab 11 Lagos Street/ Ab 11 Lagos Street; Kaduna Road/ Ab 11 Bayajida By Kaduna Road; Lagos Street By Gombe Road; Ibrahim Taiwo/ T. Wada Bus Stop/ T. Wada B/St; Bayajida Road I/ 001 Bayajida By Kano Road; Bayajida Road II/ Ag/11 Katsina Road/ Magaji; Warri Street I/ 007 Warri Street; Warri Street II/ Ax 7 Warri Street/ Warri Street; Benin Street I/ At 7 Benin Street; Benin Street II/ Au 10 Kano Road; Calabar Street/ Aw Calabar Street; Lea Shehu Abdullahi/ L. E. A. Shehu Abdullahi; Ogbomosho West/ 30 Ogbomosho Road; Central Market/ Federal Inland Rev. Office; Magadishu Arewa/ Ksmc Gate; Kontongora Rd. I/ Ahmadu Bello
Kaduna North	Kabala Costain/ Doki	Bima Road/ Cabs Hostel; Ilorin Road/ Abuth Gate; Kaduna Recreation Club; Ggdss/ Tafawa Balewa; Ribadu Crescent/ Nphc; Marafa Estate/ Managers Office; Independence Way/ Ggss Gate; L. E. A. Sabon Gari; Police Inspectors Mess; Kabala Mounted Troop; Swimming Pool Road/ Police College Gate; Hassan Usman Park; Ung. Dagau/ Kg Mai Unguwa Kabala; Ung. Inuwa Wanzami/ Kg Inuwa Wanzami; Dandali Kabala/ Kg Goggo; K/G Sarkin Kabala Doki; Kabala Wambebe/ Kg Hajiya Zara; Unguwar Sala/ Near Barber Shop; L. E. A. Ja'afaru Estate; L. E. A. Ja'afaru Estate II; L. E. A. Kabala Costain I; L. E. A. Kabala Costain II; Ja'afaru Estate By Managers Office; Kasupda Quarters/ Kasupda Workshop; Kabala Guest Inn; Kabla Mai Kosai I By Airforce House; Kabla Mai Kosai II By Airforce House; Ung./Anti/Kg Haiya Umma; Ung/Liman By Lungun Liman; Kg Magajin Aska; Kabala Ladi/ Kg Nasiru Bama; Mai Unguwa Area/ Kg Iliyasu Latsi; Behind Orem Sons House; Kg Mai Unguwa House; Swimming Pool/ Police College; Gamji Gate
Kaduna North	Gabasawa	Accra Crescent/ G/Durumi; Lome Street/ Islamiya School; Kakaki Road/ Appolo Hotel; Fed. H/ Estate I/ Authority Office; Fulani Road I/ K/G D. O; Fulani Close I/ Kg Sule Gunda; Fulani Close II/ B/Kingsway; Fulani Road II/ K. G. Ganda; Kinshasha/ Song Road Junction; Song Road/ Rimi Ext. Junction; Etsu/ Ohinoyi Road Junction; Jama'a Road/ K. Gidan Tunzuri; Jaji Road/ K. Gidan Alh. Hussaini; B/Gwari Road/ K. Gidan Alh. Abdulmumini; B/Yero Road/ K. Gidan Mama Bose; Ramat Road/ Daro Chemist; Sadau Usman I/ K/G Maigoro Katsina; Sadau Usman II/ Old Market; Sadau Usman III; Accra Road/ Luwanu Junction; K. D. S. G. Housing Estate/ Behind K. S. W. B.; L. E. A. Unguwar Rimi I; L. E. A. Unguwar Rimi II; L. E. A. Unguwar Rimi III; District Head Office; L. E. A. Unguwan Rimi Lowcost I; L. E. A. Unguwan Rimi Lowcost II; Luwanu Road Madarasatu; Ung. Isa Chori II/ Kg Yahaya; Ung. Chori II/ K. G. Mai Unguwa; L. E. A. U/Kudu I; L. E. A. U/Kudu II; Mai Chori III/ Kg Nathaniel; Ung. Dodo Achi I/ K. G Maidogo U/Kudu; Ung. Dodo Achi II/ K. G Maidogo U/Kudu; Ung. Mairiga I/ Kg Mairiga; Ung. Mairiga II/ Kg Mairiga; Ung. Nock/ Kg Mai Unuwa; Queen Amina/ Gwari Crescent/ Kagara Close; Degel I & II/ Rimi College Admin Block; Gobarau/ Camp Road Junction; Federal Housing Estate
Kaduna North	Unguwan Sarki	Waff Road/ Nidb; Sokoto Road/ Naf Headquarters; W/Board Hqtrs/ Alimi Railway Property; Alimi/ Independence; Alkali Road Yakubu Avenue; Alkali/Galadima/Opp. Brig. Remawa's House; Hamdala S/Pool; Kwato Road/ After Roundabout; Sulktan Jabi Road Junction; P. T. C./ Gate; Capital School Gate. Isa Kaita; Inuwa Wada/ Gwabe Road; Fascom Office Gate; Katuru Road I/ School Of Home Economics; Katuru Road/ Yobe State Guest House; L. E. A. Sultan Bello I; L. E. A. Sultan Bello II; Dawaki/Katuru Rd/ Dawaki Kanagara Junction; Unguwar Moh'D King; G. D. S. S. U/Sarki I; G. D. S. S. U/Sarki II; Kankia/Dawaki I/ Chasel Hospital; Kankia/Dawaki II; Runka/Marnona Road Opp. N. D. A.; Kankia Road/ Kg Bala Kankaba; Wurno/Runka Rd - Kg Col. Iliyasu Katsina (Rtd); Safana Road/ Kg Labojibia; Kofar Gidan Mamman Katsina; Munkaila Road/ Kg Alh. Adamu; Runwan Godiya Road/ Kg Abbas Haruna; Capital School Gate/ Isa Kaita
Kaduna North	Badarawa	Badarawa Clinic; National Population Gate; Kasuwan Badarawa/ K. Gidan Tsoho Dutse; L. E. A. Badarawa I/ L. E. A. Badarawa; L. E. A. Badarawa II/ L. E. A. Badarawa; Sabon Gari Badarawa I/ K. Gidan Gari; Sabon Gari Badarawa II/ Down Valley Junction; Sabon Gari Badarawa III/ Kwaru Market/ Majalisah; Katuru Road/ Junction By Philmorre Hotel; Ung. Maude I/ K/Gidan Alhaji Jibo; Ung. Maude II/ K/Gidan Alhaji Yau; Ung. Maude III/ Katsina Road Opp. Joe Hotel; Ung. Galadima/ K/G Mai Galadima; Ung. Yero/ K/Gidan Mai Ung. Auta Dikko; Bus Stop Badarawa; Shagari Road/ Junction Road Malali; Yarbakuwa I/ K/Gidan Yarkabuwa; Yarkabuwa II/ K/Gidan Sarki Margi; Yarkabuwa III/ No. 6 Kuriga Road; Ung. Katafawa/ K/Gidan M. Yahaya; Ung. Gwari (Maisamari)/ K/Gidan Maisamari; Ung. Auta/ Area Court; Ung. Gado/ K/G Mai Unguwan Kasuwa; Malali Market Village I/ Dandali Centre I; Malali Market Village II/ Dandali Centre II; Malali Bus Stop I; Malali Bus Stop II; Malali Lowcost I/ Lea Malali I; Malali Lowcost I/ Lea Malali II; Malali Lowcost II/ (Ksdpc)/ Ksdpc Malali; Hydro Works By Ghana Road; Prestige Restaurant Malali; Malali Lowcost Market I/ Malali Lowcost Met; Malali Lowcost Market II/ Malali Lowcost Met; Ung. Gado/ K/Gidan Mai Ung. Ishaya; Water Board Station Gate; Federal Govt. College I/ Fed. Govt Gate I; Federal Govt. College II/ Fed. Govt Gate II; Technical School Gate; Ung. Gado II/ K. Gidan Mamman; Malali Bus Stop III
Kaduna North	Unguwan Dosa	State House Gate Kawo; Demonstration Primary School; K. T. C. Admin Block; G. G. S. S./ Front Gate; S. M. C. Admin Block; Kuchia/ Layin Kukah Kg Hajiya Mai Waina; College Road/ Abbatoir Junction; Abbatoir Road Ggss Backyard Gate; Unguwan Dosa I/ Gidan Ruwa; Unguwan Dosa II/ K. G Mai Unguwa; Ung. Dosa III/ K. G Tanimu Mai Makaranta; Abbatoir Rd/ Gidan Liman Kofar G/Mai U/L; New Extension/ Pawa Road; New Extension/ College Road End; Lere Street I/ Before Kenarbo Hotel; L. E. A. Unguwan Dosa; College Road/ Mai Babura; College/ Lemu Road Kasuwan Dare; Karaye Road I/ Old Police Post U/Dosa; College Rd/ Commissioner Road; College Rd/ Kenarbo Hotel; College Rd/ Opposite Luchia Hotel; Kasuwan Rimi/ Sunna Clinic; S. M. C./ Housing Quarters 3rd Gate; M. C. Quarters III (Blk Road); S. M. C. Quarters 1st Gate; State House Gate
Kaduna North	Kawo	Zaria Road I/ K. Gidan Kaura; Zaria Road II/ Kawo Clinic Gate; Kankaran Road I/ K. Gidan Shuaibu Y.; Kankaran Road II/ Near Argungu House; Yamusa Road/ Near Islamiya School; Zangon Aya Road I/ D. 1 K. Gidan Labbo; Zangon Aya Road II/ No. 5 Zangon Aya Road; Kafin Sole Rad I/ K. Gidan Panel Beater; Kafin Sole Rad II/ K. Gidan Maidoki; Daudawa Road By K/G Alh. Tsalha; Kawo Road I/ By Halliru Usman Shop; Kawo Road II/ Opposite Area Court; Darma Road/ Opposite Haruna House; Marwa Road F/ No. 1 Marwa Road; Gdss Kawo I; Gdss Kawo II; Gwari Close/ No. 133 Gwari Crescent; Liko Gwari I/ K/Gidan Mai Unguwa; Liko Gwari II/ L. E. A. Ung. Gwari; Ung. Dogo/ L. E. A. Ung. Gwari; Mai Turmi Street/ Road/ K/Gidan Maiturmi; Airport Umar Street/ L. E. A. Kawo; L. E. A. Kawo; Naf Quarters I/ K/Gidan Umaru Murtala; Kudansa Road I/ K/Gidan Alkali Behind; Kudansa Road II/ By Carpenter Kawo Market; Nasarawa Road/ Nasarawa By Road To Kawo; Kakuri Road/ K/Gidan Sabo Mai Jaki; Makarfi Road/ K/Gidan Hajiya Bebi; Ahmed Aminu Street/ Opposite Ibewa Clinic; Bajju Street/ Foundation N/Pri. Sch.; Kubau Road/ Rafin Guza Junction; Sabon Birnin Street/ New Extension Junction; Yantukwane/ K/Gidan Bukar Mallam; Tsohuwar Kwata I/ K/Gidan Mai Unguwa; Tsohuwar Kwata II/ T. V. Viewing Centre; Rafin Guza I/ K/Gidan Usman; Rafin Guza II/ By Bus Stop; Rafin Guza III/ K/Gidan Mai Unguwa; Rafin Guza III; Airport/ L. E. A. Kawo
Kaduna North	Hayin Banki	Dandali Centre/ No. F. 13 Opp. Maitsire; Dandali West I/ No. 53 Filin Itace; Dandali West II/ No. 53 Filin Itace; Dandali North/ No. F. 13 Abdallah; Dandali South/ No. 20 Baso Road; L. E. A. Hayun Banki/ L. E. A Hayin Banki; Dandali Datti M/ Shayi/ Dandalli Datti M/Shayi; Kalaye Road/ Dandali/ Dandali Datti M/Shayi; Barrack Road/ K. Gidan Suleja; Lemu Road I/ Burial Ground; Lemu Road II/ Mami Market Gate; New Nigeria Package/ Nn Packaging S/Gari; Mando Garage I/ Local Govt. Area Office; Mando Garage II/ Gate Three; Mando Veterinary/ Mando Veterinary Gate; National Water Res. Inst. Gate; B. A. T. C. Mando/ B. A. T. C. Mando; Madunka Motors; L. E. A. A/ Kanawa I/ L. E. A A/Kanawa; L. E. A. Ung. Kanawa II/ L. E. A. A/Kanawa; Layin Umaru Sanda/ Gidan Umaru Sanda; Galadima Road/ Gidan Uwani Alin Kwari; Saminaka Road I/ Gidan Yusuf Sambo Rigachikun; Layin Dan Dambe/ Gidan Samaila Shunbu M/Gashi; Layin Naiya Wanzami/ K/Gidan Naiya Wanzami; Makama Road I/ Y A Photo Studio; Kagarko Road/ Chediyar Kadam; Zuntu Street II/ Zango House; Kasuwar Mata/ Gindin Mangwaro; Zuntu Street II/ Gidan Ali; Makama Road II/ Gidan Alh. Armayau; Abba Road/ Gidan Mai Unguwa; Saminaka Road II; New Nigeria/ N. N. P. S. Gari
Kaduna North	Unguwan Shanu	Lagos Street I/ K/Gidan Ibrahim/Masa; Lagos Street II/ K. 3 Gidan Mohammed Malumfashi; Rafuka Road I/ No. 16 Rafuka Road; Rafuka Road II/ Railway Line By Kofar G/Ibra; Badarawa Road/ K/Gidan Moh'D Sukele; Garun Kurama Road I/ K/Gidan Hassan Bill; Garun Kurama Road II/ K/Gidan G. C. T. Mutum; Kuriga Road/ Public Pump II; Dandamisa Road/ By Public Pump II; Kufena Road/ No. 1 Kufena Road; Dankano Road/ No. 4 Dankano Road; Rimaye Road/ Xc 9 Rimaye Road; Rafin Dadi Road; Malamawa Road/ K/Gidan Abd Mai Inji; Sarkin Ung./ Shanu Off/ Sarkin Ung. Shanu; Maternity Clinic; Jaji Road I/ K/Gidan Mr. Oyewo; Jaji Road II/ X. 7 Jaji Road; Jaji Road III/ K/Gidan Adams; Bakin Kasuwa I/ Police Station; Bakin Kasuwa II/ K/Gidan Daniel; Danmusa Road/ K/Gidan Mr. Elijah; Dutse Road/ K/Gidan Iliya; Tudun James I; Tudun James II; L. E. A. Abakpa I; L. E. A. Abakpa II; L. E. A. Abakpa III; Red Cross Office/ Red Cross Office; Nepa Power Station; Ibrahim Waziri Crescent/ Katsina State Liaison; Dandunbi Court/ K/Gidan Magaji Aska; Railway Station I/ Kaduna North Railway Station; Railway Station II/ Zonal Office Kad Moe; Ung. Sarki/ Ung. Shanu
Kaduna South	Makera	Kasuwa Katako/ Kasuwa Katako; L. E. A Railway I/ L. E. A Railway I; L. E. A Railway II/ L. E. A Railway II; L. E. A Railway III/ L. E. A Railway III; Ung. Mission/ Ung. Mission; General Pump I/ General Pump I; General Pump II/ General Pump II; General Pump III/ General Pump III; No. 75 Chediya Rd/ No. 75 Chediya Rd; No. 8/B/326 G/Dutse, No. 8/B/326 G/Dutse; No. 5/B 15 Gambarawa, No. 5/B 15 Gambarawa; No. 8 Umaru Danlaje, No. 8 Umaru Danlaje; No. 8 Kafange Street, No. 8 Kafange Street; No. 3 Kanfange Street, No. 3 Kafange Street; No. Mb10 Frnace Road, No. Mb10 Frnace Road; Arewa Cinema, No. Mb10 Frnace Road; Lafia Road Makera, No. Mb10 Frnace Road; No. 5 Blk 14 K/Rd. Makera, No. 5 Blk 14 K/Rd. Makera; No. 3 Blk 3 K/Rd. Makera, No. 3 Blk 3 K/Rd. Makera; No. 3 Blk 15 N/State Hotel Makera; No. 2 Health Clinic Makera, No. 2 Health Clinic Makera; Durimin Jamo, Durimin Jamo; No. 7 Blk 14 Makera, No. 7 Blk 14 Makera; No. 6 Blk 29 Durumin Jamo, No. 6 Blk 29 Durumin Jamo; No. 6 Durumin Jamo Street, No. 6 Durumin Jamo Street; Kofar Aminu, Kofar Aminu; L. E. A. Babban Dodo I, L. E. A. Babban Dodo I; L. E. A. Babban Dodo II, L. E. A. Babban Dodo II; No. 6 Blk 26 Gambarawa, No. 6 Blk 26 Gambarawa; L. E. A. Babban Dodo III, L. E. A. Babban Dodo III; No. 9 Popular Hotel Makera/ No. 9 Popular Hotel; No. 28 Zango Street Makera, No. 28 Zango Street Makera; No. 68 Galadima Street, No. 68 Galadima Street; No. 6/69 Umaru Danlajest, No. 68 Galadima Street; Mobile Police Qtrs. Faskari Street; L. E. A. Samaru Street, L. E. A. Samaru Street; No. 8 Galadima Street I, No. 8 Galadima Street I; No. 8 Galadima Street II, No. 8 Galadima Street II; No. 29 Galadima Street, No. 29 Galadima Street; Kofar Bala Mai Hula, Kofar Bala Mai Hula; Ung. Mission, Ung. Mission; Kofar Gidan Sarkin Makera, Kofar Gidan Sarkin Makera; No. 27 Alh. Moh'D Paskari St., No. 27 Alh. Moh'D Paskari St.; Galadimawa New Extension, Galadimawa New Extension; Asibitin Dutse, Asibitin Dutse; Kofar Kafinta, Kofar Kafinta; No. 853 Mai Ruwa Road, No. 853 Mai Ruwa Road
Kaduna South	Barnawa	L. E. A. Barnawa I, L. E. A. Barnawa I; L. E. A. Barnawa II, L. E. A. Barnawa II; L. E. A. Barnawa III, L. E. A. Barnawa III; L. E. A. Barnawa IV, L. E. A. Barnawa IV; G. D. S. S. Barnawa, G. D. S. S. Barnawa; Barnawa Clinic, Barnawa Clinic; Market Road Barnawa I; No. 16 Rada Road, No. 16 Rada Road; Market Road Barnawa II; Old Village Head Office, Old Village Head Office; Chalawa Crescent, Chalawa Crescent; L. E. A. Aliyu Makama I, L. E. A. Aliyu Makama I; L. E. A. Aliyu Makama II, L. E. A. Aliyu Makama II; L. E. A. Aliyu Makama III, L. E. A. Aliyu Makama III; Dan Alhaji Ung. Barde, Dan Alhaji Ung. Barde; Shopping Complex, Shopping Complex; Shopping Complex U I., Shopping Complex U I.; Shopping Complex U II., Shopping Complex U II.; Shopping Complex III./ Shopping Complex; No. 16 Zambiya Road, No. 16 Zambiya Road; Federal Housing Estate, Federal Housing Estate; Shagari Low Cost, Shagari Low Cost; Uganda/Gwari Anenue; Angola /G/ Avenue, Angola/ G/ Avenue; Village Head Office I./ Village Head Office; Village Head Office II./ Village Head Office; No. 9 Radda Road, No. 9 Radda Road
Kaduna South	Kakuri Gwari	Mobile Police Barrack, Mobile Police Barrack; Artilary Barrack, Artilary Barrack; L. E. A. Kakuri Gwari I, L. E. A. Kakuri Gwari I; L. E. A. Kakuri Gwari II, L. E. A. Kakuri Gwari II; L. E. A. Kakuri Gwari III, L. E. A. Kakuri Gwari III; L. E. A. Kakuri Gwari IV, L. E. A. Kakuri Gwari IV; Monday Clinic, L. E. A. Monday Clinic; Monday Market, Monday Market; Unguwan Makama/, Unguwan Makama; V. 22 Kwanan Ashara K1/ V. 22 Kwanan Ashara; V. 22 Kwanan Ashara K2/ V. 22 Kwanan Ashara; Aa. Afaka Road, Aa. Afaka Road; D. I. C. Quarters, D. I. C. Quarters; Birnin Gwari Road, Birnin Gwari Road
Kaduna South	Television	L. E. A. U/Maichibi Ai./ L. E. A. Ung. Maichibi I.; Lea U/Maichibi II; Lea U/Maichibi V; Lea U/Maichibi VI; L. E. A. U/Maichibi IV./ L. E. A U/Maichibi IV.; L. E. A. U/Maichibi VI./ L. E. A U/Maichibi V.; Near Television Market; J. 25 Jaba/ Shandam Road; Kr. 76 Iyaka Street; Jb. 40 Bahago Road; F 15 Pawa/ Kataf Road; Behind 2nd Ecwa Church; Ecwa Eng. Church; E. 45 Hauwasa Road; C. 35 Television Road; C. 18 Television Road; R. I. Gwari/ Kagoro Road/ R I Gwari/Kagoro Road; Kasuwar Kosai; Motor N Park
Kaduna South	Kakuri Hausa	District Head Office; District Head Office I.; District Head Office II.; Rendervous Hotel; Yan Awaki Market; Yan Gado Kakuri Market; K/Market A. Market; P. 12 Fadan Ayu Street; Mahuta Road Bus Stop; Queen Amina Gate; Tsohuwar Kasuwa; Village Head Office; Kandutse/ Arewa Gate; Kakuri A/ Rail; Kakuri Road B/ Medicine; B/Gwari Roda. D/House; F/Ayu Street Barima; Dawakin Basa Road/ Pawa; Pawa/Dawakin Basa Junction; No. 20 F/Ikulu Road; Q4 Gora Street; R. Gyeshere Road; 58 Dawaki B/Close; W5 Tandama Street; No. 136 D/Bassa Road; Kakuri Extension I.; Mani Road; 020 Gyeshere Road; Kakuri New Extension II; Y15 Fadan Ikulu Road; Y24 Gora Road; Arewa Textiles Road; Untl Quarters N/Extension
Kaduna South	Tudun Wada North	Fg. Ibrahim Taiwo Road; Fx 8 Alkalawa Road; Fv 11 Richifa Road; Fn 8 Kumashi Road; Fm 8 Alkalawa Road; Fc 7 Soba Road; Kh 6 Soba Road; Fq 26 Layin Kosai; Fq 8 Alkalawa Road; Kw 13 Alkalawa Road; Kw 12 Alkalawa Road; Ibrahim Taiwo/ Soba Road; District Head Office; Area Court II; G2 Ibrahim Taiwo Road; Lt 5 Kaltingo Road; F1 Gwarzo Road; Kw 8 Kakanda Road; Kw 9 Kakanda Road; Lm 10 Gwarzo Road; Lq 11 Tiv Road I.; Lq 11 Tiv Road II; B 38 Dutsinma Road; 29 Dutsinma Road; No. 13 Zango Close; Lo 3 Gwarzo Road; Kw10 Kumashi Road; La 4 Gwarzo Road; Lq 11 Tiv Road III.; Ky 20 Kaltingo Road; Tq 8 Alkalawa Road
Kaduna South	Tudun Wada South	Gd 17 Bashama Road; Kx 48 Hausawa Road; Kx 41 Lere Street; Kx 80 Hausawa Road; Kz 30 Hausawa Road; Gh 9 Fulani Road; Gh 3 Lere Street; Kz 7a Lere Street; Gb 10 Richifa/Basima Rd; Kx 70 Hausawa Road; Kv 158 Kachiya Road; Kv 143 Bashama; Kv 126 Bashama Road; Gh 1 Fulani Road; Kv 96 Fulani Road; Pm 2 Makarfi Road; Pr 6 Igabi Road; Pt 10 Numan Road; Asibitin Yara; Pg. 4 Ibrahim Taiwo Road; Pc 10 Makarfi Road; Pbi Ibrahim Taiwo Road; Kv 21 Makarfi Road; Kv 181 Igabi Road; Kv 121 Igabi Road; Kv 8 Soba Street; Pt. 20 Numan Road; Pw 10 Soba Street; Ph 19 Igabi Road; Ky 4 Igabi Road; No. 56 Katagun Road I.; No. 56 Katagun Road II; Kv 12 Kaje Road; Kv 80 Hausawa Road; Gm 10 Hausawa Road; Ky 18 Kaje/ Zango Road; Ky 2 Shetima Road; Ky 2 Katagum/ Shetima Road; Kaje Road; Ky 5 Bima Road; Ky Mashi/ Zango Road; Go 6 Hausawa Road; Kv 34 Shetima Road; Ky 11 Kaje Road
Kaduna South	Tudun Nuwapa	Fire Brigade; Irra Road/ Fire Brigade; L. E. A. Tudun Nuwapa; B16 Tudun Ilu; B24 Tudun Ilu; Police Station T/Ilu; A2 Ibrahim Taiwo Road; A 11 Ibrahim Taiwo Road; B24 Ibrahim Taiwo Road; No. 10 Yola Road; H. 6 Yola Road; N3 Yola Road; Af 17 Yola Road; Af 16 Bima Road; F1 Bima Road; H. 16 Mashi Road; F4 Gulbi Road; Ax 16 Kajuru Road; Bc 1 Afaka Road; No. 9/10 Ribado Road; Am 2 Ribado Road; As 1 Ribado Road; At5 Ribado Road; Ar. 8 New Bida Road; B2 New Bida Road; Ar 15 Gero Road; Aw 10 Funtua Road; Af 16 Funtua Road; Ba 8 Lemu Road; Aq 1 Lemu Road; At 16 Minna Road; Ax 5 Minna Road; An 14 Maska Road; Gidan Madawaki Badde; Y. M. C. A; Police Qtrs. Poly Road; Am 2 Rock Road; Zc 3 Rock Road; Zc 20 Rock Road; F5 Irra Road; J. 19 Irra Road; F10 Malumfashi Road; C1 Malumfashi Road I.; C1 Malumfashi Road II.; Bl 7 Enugu Road; Bq 11 Kawo Road; Bp 11 Independence Road; Poly Staff Quarters; Poly Junior Quarters
Kaduna South	Sabon Gari South	L. E. A. Moh. Kabir I; L. E. A. Moh. Kabir II; Cc 42 Sirajo Road; Cc 60 Sirajo Road; Cg 24 Zango Road; Cg 2 Zango Road; Ce 16 Musawa Road; Cd 9 Musawa Road I; Cd 9 Musawa Road II; C1 Kwoi Street; C24 Saulawa Road; L. E. A. Faki Road I.; L. E. A. Faki Road II.; L. E. A. Faki Road III.; By 3 Dutsenma Street; Bs 13 Dutsenma Street; Bj 2 Gurbabiya Road; Ga 7 Aminu Dandauda; Ga 22 Matazu Road; L. E. A. Kargi Road I.; L. E. A. Kargi Road II.; Bo 2 Kabala Road; D 15 Kabala Road; Yp 33 Kabala Road; Ce 1 Kabala Road; L. E. A. Kagoro Road I.; L. E. A. Kagoro Road II.; L. E. A. Kagoro Road III.; Bd 6 Gurbabiya Road; Be Kataf Road
Kaduna South	Sabon Gari North	V 12 Faki Road; Cw 2 Kubau Road; An Gamagira Road; At 1 Gamagira Road; Al Manchock Road; An 22 Faki Road I; An 22 Faki Road II; Ag 2 Faskari Road; Manchok/ Faskari; Ad 42 Matazu Road; Ad 35 Gangara Road; Y3 Rigachikun Road; Am 43 Mando Road; Ex 17 Kagoro Road; No. 7 Kagoro Road; Y 25 Kagoro; Ac 1 Matazu Road I; Y60 Matazu Road; At 21 Jada Road; Af 37 Faki Road; Y58 Charanchi Road; W 50 Dutsenma Street; W 16 Gangara Road; Ss 35 Jibiya Road; Af 16 Kerawa Road; P 15a Jaji Road; Ak 24 Faki Road; L. E. A. Sheik Gumi I; L. E. A. Sheik Gumi II; B3 Faskari Road; Dantata House; Hamdala Hotel; Aci Matazu Road II
Kaduna South	Ung. Sanusi	L. E. A Chawai Road I; L. E. A Maimuna Gwarzo; G. D. S. S. Maimuna Gwarzo; Asekolaye III; Ah 7 Atiku Auwal; No. 15 Kagoma Road; Af 15 Jama'a Road; No. 6 Muhammed Wule; H6 Kagoma Road; No. 34 Gaskiya Road; No. 95 Akote Road; No. 37 Daban Road; M61 Imam Road; D3 Akote Road; Ag 8 Kagoma Road; Cc1 Akote Road; Af 40 Daban Road; 25 Imam Road; Nn12 Bature Road; Bb24 Prp Line; Dr 9 Prp Line I; Dr 9 Prp Line II; Ff3 Dogon Bauchi; B8 Dogon Bauchi; Hassan Katsina Road; Rigasa Junction; Asekolaye I; Asekolaye II; Bb24 Prp Line II
Kaduna South	Badiko	L. E. A Badiko I; L. E. A Badiko II; L. E. A Badiko III; L. E. A Badiko IV; L. E. A Badiko V; Ba 2 Salau Road Badiko; No. 50 Sallau Road; G 10 Magaji Road; Kofar Gidan Mai Unguwa; Al 9 Mamman Dawai; Army Children School I; Army Children School II; Sir Kashim Ibrahim House; Army Children School III; Army Children School IV; 44 Main Gate Kaduna; Govt. College Kaduna; Gindin Rimi Badiko; Govt. College Kaduna I; Govt. College Kaduna II; Be 19 Madawaki Road Badiko; Gwamna Road Kaduna; Zakariya Hotel; A16 Badamasi Road; Afumu Bakery Badiko; Ab 6 Kaura Road; L. E. A. Kurmin Mashi I; L. E. A. Kurmin Mashi II; L. E. A. Kurmin Mashi III; L. E. A. Kurmin Mashi IV; N. D. A. I. 'A'; N. D. A. I. 'B'; N. D. A. II. 'A'; N. D. A. II. 'B'; Sarki Avenue; Area 4 Kurmin Mashi; No. 39 Sarki Avenue K/Mashi; Area 5 - 167 S/Line K/Mashi; No. 26 Defence Avenue; Area 1. No. 256 Zaria Road; Daura S/Line K/Mashi
Kagarko	Kagarko North	Kagarko I/ Rimi Kagarko; Kagarko II/ Old Police Station; Ung. Waje/ Kofar Mai Maje; Ung. Makera/ Dispensary; Kasangwai/ Ung. Rana/ K/Gidan Sarki; Doguwa/ Pa Baki/ K/Gidan Maianguwa; Ung. Bisa/ K/Gidan Ma'azu; Ranji/ Kurmin Kira; Akote I/ L. E. A. Akote; Akote II/ Dispensary; Kagarko III/ K/M Unguwa
Kagarko	Kagarko South	Bakin Kasuwa; Kabiji/ Asibitin Shanu; Ung. Kurmi/ K/G Maianguwan; Ung. Pah/ K/Gidan Yari; Janjala/ K/Gidan Magaji; Kudiri/ K/Gidan Sarki; Kuse/ K. Gidan Sarki; Sabon Iche/ K. Gidan Sarki; Dogon Daji/ K/Gidan Maianguwan; Kabeji II/ Kofar M. Unguwan
Kagarko	Kushe	Kushe I/ K/Fada; Kushe II/ L. E. A. Pri. School; Marke/ L. E. A Marke; Kasabera/ L. E. A D/Kurmi; Dogon Kurmi/ K/G/ Primary School Dogo Kurmi; Chakula/ K. Gidan Maiunguwa; Kafarma/ Kg. Mai Unguwa; Kuchi/Kukwari/ K/G/Maianguwa; Kadiri D. Kurmi/ K/G/Maianguwa; Kushe III/ Pri. Sch.
Kagarko	Jere North	Ung. Magaji I/ K/Ma'aji; Cigwami/ K/Sarki; Yelwa/ L. E. A. Yelwa; Karofi/Fadama/ K/Sarki; Gidan Kwasau/ L. E. A. Pri. Kwasau; Kafinta/Kaguni/ K. Sarki; Kasiri/ K/Gidan Sarki; Kofar Lauya/ K/G/Sarki; Bakin Kasuwa/ K/G/ Unguwa; Ung. Magaji II/ K/G/Unguwa
Kagarko	Jere South	Gidan Kara/ Kofar Sarki; Galandaci/ K/Gidan Maianguwa; Fantare/ K/Gidan Dangaladima; Dumale/ L. E. A. Pri. D/Male; Bakin Kasuwa/ K/G Mamman Shuwa; Ung. Fada/ D. H. Office; Masu - Kwani/ Gidan M. Mohammed; Gidan-Jibo/ Gidan Jibo; Makera/ L. E. A. Makera; Iffe/ L. E. A Iffe; Pana/ K/Gidan Maianguwa; Gidan Kara II/ K/Gidan Maianguwa
Kagarko	Iddah	Iddah/ L. E. A Iddah; Gujeni/ L. E. A Gujeni; Taffa Gari/ Kg. Sarki; Kucikau/ L. E. A. Primary School Babu; Tunga Chakwama/ L. E. A Tunga; Chakwama/ L. E. A Chakwama; Issah/ L. E. A. Primary School Issah; Kwasere/ L. E. A. Primary Kwasere; Kwaliko/ L. E. A Kwaliko; Pmape/ K/Gsarki; Bakuchi/ K/G Sarki; Taffa/ L. E. A. School Dumale Taffa
Kagarko	Aribi	Aribi I/ Pri. Sch. Aribi; Aribi II/ Kofar Sarki; Kutaho I/ Pri. Sch. Kutaho I; Kutaho II/ Pri. Sch. Kutaho II; Kumbai/Badako/ Kofar Sarki; Kumbai/Tuhura/ Kofar Sarki; Kujir/Ung. Madaki/ Kujur Ung. Madaki; Kurata/ Pri. Sch. Kuratam; Kurmin Dangana/ Pri. Sch. K. Dangona; Kenyi Ung. Sarki/ Pri. Sch. Kenyi; Kenyi II/ Pri. Sch. Kenyi; Kukyer/ Pri. Sch. Kuyer; Ruzai/ Pri. Sch. Ruzai; Kasaru Badije/ K. G. Sarki; Kabara/ Pri. Sch. Kabara; Gantan// Pri. Sch. Gatan; Ung. Pah/Gurara/ K/G Sarki; Sawanno/Kenyi/ K/G/Unguwan; Ung. Galadima/Lemo/ K/G/Sarki
Kagarko	Kurmin Jibrin	Kurmin Jibrin/ Pri. Sch. K. Jibrin; Shadalafiya/ Pri. Sch. Shadalafiya I; Shadalafiya II/ Pri. Sch. Shadalafiya II; Icche/Sabon Gida/ K. G. Sarki; Chigwa/ Kofar Sarki; Idideh/ K/M Unguwa; Kurmin Jibrin II/ K/M Unguwa; Kurmin Jibrin III/ K/M Sarki; S/Gida/ K/M Unguwa
Kagarko	Katugal	Katugal Sabon Gari/ Pri. Sch. Katugal; Katugal Tsoho/ Pri. Sch.; Nkojo/ Pri. Sch.; Koko/ Pri. Sch.; Gora 'B'/ Pri. Sch.; Kubacha Ung. Sarki/ Motor Park; Kubacha Ung. Akato/ K/M Unguwan; Kumhanfa I & II/ Pri. Sch.; Ung. Madaki Kubacha/ K/M Unguwan; Ung. Madaki Katugal/ K/M Unguwan; Ung. Jaba Kubacha - K. Maiunguwa; Katugal S/Gari II/ K/M Unguwan
Kagarko	Kukui	Kukui I/ Pri. Sch. Kukui; Kusam/ Pri. Sch. Kusam; Kukok/ K/M Unguwa; Kubere/ K/M Unguwa; Icce/Bisa/ K/M Unguwa; Kuch/Kusam II/ K/M Unguwa; Kukui II/ K/M Unguwa; Chigwa/ K/M Unguwa
Kajuru	Kajuru	Kajuru Gari I/Lgea Pri. Kajuru; Ung. Daki/ Area Court K.; District Head/ District Head Office; Ung. Liman/ K/Gliman; Ung. Ardo/ K/G/M/Ardo; Ung. Juli/ K/G Mai. Unguwan; Kajuru Gari II/ L. G. E. A. Kajuru
Kajuru	Tantatu	Kujeni/ K/G M/Anguwan; Gyangyare/ Lgea Pri. Gyan Gare; Kutura Gari I/ K/G Sarki; Kutura Hausa/ L. G. Clinic K.; Kutura Station/ Lgea Pri. Kutura; Aguba/ K/G M/Anguwan; Kajuru Station/ Lgea Pri. Kajuru Station; Kutura Gari II/ K/G Sarki
Kajuru	Kufana	Tudun Mare I/ Lgea Pri. T/Mare; Kokob/ K/G Alkali; Ung. Galadima/ Lgea Pri. U/Rana; Ung. Rana/ Lgea Pri. Kufana; Kufana Town/ Lgea Pri. Kufana; Ung. Madaki/ Lgea Pri. U/Ugoh; Ang. Ugoh/ K/G M/Anguwan; Ang. Hannu/ Kadp M/Danbagud; M/Danbagdu/ K/G Ibrahim; Ung. Danbaba/ K/G Abasiya; Ung. Washiri/ K/G M/Anguwa; Apilifoh/ K/G M/Anguwa; Opp. S. Farm/ K/G M/Anguwa; Loko/ G. S. S. Kuf; G. S. S. Kufana/ Lgea Pri. R/Kunu; Rafin Kunu/ K/G Sarki; Ang. Madaki/ K/G Tukura; Ang. Tukura/ Lgea Pri. Ngukwu; Nguwaku I/ K/G M/Anguwan; Nguwaku II/ K/G Maiunguwan; Banono/ K/G Mai Unguwan; Tudun Mare II/Lgea T/Mare; Ung. Ugoh II/ K/G Mai Unguwa
Kajuru	Afogo	Danbagudu/ Lgea Pri. D/Bagudu; Ung. S/Afogo/ Lgea Pri. Afogo; Afogo Gida/ Bus Stop; Agwalla/ Lgea Pri. Agwalla; Iburu Hanya/ Lgea Pri. Iburu; Iburu Gari/ K/G M/Anguwa; Kurmin Idon/ Lgea Pri. Idon; Kampani/ K/G M/Anguwa; Ung. Alkali/ K/G Sale; Ung. S/Noma/ Playground; M/Afogo/ K/G Maiunguwa; Atee Village/ K/G Maiunguwa; K/Wali/ K/G Maiunguwa; Ung. Adunga/ K/G Maiunguwa; Agwalla II/ L. G. E. A. Agwalla
Kajuru	Kasuwan Magani	D. E. O. Office, D. E. O Office; Clinic/ D. E. O. Office; K/Magani I/ K/M Clinic; K/Magani II/ Lgea Pri. I; K/Magani III/ Lgea Pri. I; K/Gidan Sarki/ K/G Mai Unguwa; K/Gidan Waziri/ K/G Mai Unguwa; K/Magani IV/Post Office; Rimau Road I/ Reading Room; Ung. Liman/ K/G Mai Unguwa; K/Magani V/Lgea Pri I; K/G Hakimi/ K/G Mai Unguwa; Rimau Road II/ Reading Room; D/Gaiya I/ Lgea Pri. I; D/Gaiya II/ Lgea Pri. I; Gurgu/ K/G Mai Unguwa; Rafin Roro/ Lgea Pri. I; S/G Roro/ K/G Mai Unguwa; Post Office/ Post Office; K/G Hakimi II/ K/G Mai Unguwa
Kajuru	Kallah	Ang. Sarki I/ K/G Sarki; Ang. Sarki II/ Kallah Clinic; Ang. Madaki/ Lgea Pri. Kallah; Ang. Maidabo/ K/G M/Anguwan; Itaci/ Lgea Pri. Itici; Atijiri/ K/G M/Anguwa; Magunguna/ K/G M/Mangunguna; Kallah East/ Vet. Clinic; Gefe I/ Lgea Pri. Gefe I; Gefe II/ Lgea Pri. Gefe II; Ung. Galadima/ K/G M/Anguwa; Libere Idu I/ Lgea Pri. Idu; Libere II/ Lgea Pri. Libere; Libere Gari/ K/G M/Anguwa; Unguwa Madaki II/ L. G. E. A. Kallah
Kajuru	Rimau	Rimau Gari/ Lgea Pri. Rimau; Ung. Madaki/ Lgea Pri. Ekuzeh; Ung. Galadima/ K/G Galadima; Ang. Baga/ K/G M/Anguwa Baga; Ang Bagama/ K/G Bagama; Ang. Turaki/ K/G Turaki; Ang. Nasamu/ K/G M/Anguwa; Ung. Barwa/ K/G Barwa; Isabe/ Lgea Pri. Sch.; Ung. Galadima II/ K/G Maiunguwa; Ung. Barwa II/ K/G Maiunguwa
Kajuru	Idon	Idon Gida I/ K/G M/Anguwa; Idon Gida II/ Lgea Pri. Idon Gida; Idon Hanya I/ Lgea Pri. Idon-H; Idon Hanya II/ Lgea Pri.; Iri Station I/ Lgea Pri. Iri St.; Iri Kadara I/ K/G M/Anguwa; Iri Station II/ K/G M/Anguwa; Gindin Dutse I/ Lgea Pri. G/Dutse; Gindin Dutse II/ Lgea Pri. G/Dutse; Makyali/ Ilgea Prim. Makyali; Ang. Waziri/ K/G M/Anguwan; Ang. Galadima/ K/G M/Anguwa; Aduma I/ Lgea Pri. Aduma; Ang. Sarki/ K/G M/Anguwa; Sabon Gida/ K/G M/Anguwa; Aduma II/ K/G Sarki; Makoro Zankaraya/ K/G M/Anguwa; Doka/ Lgea Pri. Doka; Ung. Yakubu/ K/G M/Anguwa; Ung. Ma'aji/ K/G M/Anguwa; Ung. Madaki/ K/G M/Anguwa; Iri Kadara II/ K/G M/Anguwa; Makyali II/ Lgea Pri.
Kajuru	Maro	Ang. S/Gamo/ Lgea Pri. U/Gamo; Ang. Abante/ Playground; Ang. Barde/ Lgea Pri. Barde; Ang. Sarki/ Clinic Maro; Ang. Boka/ Playground; Gwando/ Lgea Gwando; Dantaro/ Playground; Ang. Rogo/ Playground; Ang. Waziri/ Playground; Maro/ Lgea Pri. Maro; Bauda/ Playground; Karamai/ Lgea Pri. Kara Mai; Ung. Machu/ Playground; Ang. Hausawa/ Playground; Ang. Bijimi/ Playground; Ang. Hayinsuda/ Playground; Chibiya/ Lgea Pri. Chibiya; Ang. Busa/ Playground; Ang. Adamu/ Lgea Pri. Sch.; Ang. Galadima/ Playground; Ang. Madaki/ Playground; Ung. Sarki II/ Clinic Maro
Kaura	Kukum	Kukum Daji/ Ung. Kuhiyep Bidam I; Kukum Daji/ Ung. Kuhiyep Bidam II; Kukum Daji/ Aba Kajang; Kukum Gida/ Yaya Gwayit; Kukum Gida/ Aba Alla; Kukum Gida/ Yakyang; Kukum Gida/ Madaki Aba; Zakwa/ Bodam Amai I; Zakwa/ Bodam Amai II; Zakwa/ Sale; Kukum Daji/Gwanzang; Kukum Daji/ Ung. Ajiyat; Zakwa/Ung Duba Gari
Kaura	Kpak	Madamai/ Ung. Galadima; Madamai/ Ung. Madaki; Kpak/ Aba Kanwai; Kpak/ Ung. Bido; Kpak/ Allau Kwalla; Safio/ Dodo Bature; Kpak/ Hausawa; Safio/ Ung. Amai; Kpak/ Aluwong Jatau; Safio/Ung Dakachi I; Safio/Ung Dakachi II; Kpak/ Ung. Tachio
Kaura	Agban	Ung. Garkuwa/ Ung. Garruwa; Ung. Agban Gida/ La'ah Dauji; Agban Gida/ Peter Agudi; Agban Gida/ Kolai Nikaf; Tsonje/ Kanwai Atung; Tsonje/ Yasang; Garaje/ La'ah/ Atong; Garaje/ Ashin Abui; Tsonje/ Sabon Gari; Garaje/ Ung. Ationg I; Garaje/ Ung. Ationg II; Garaje/ Adan; Zunuruk/ Yaro Shekari
Kaura	Kadarko	Kadarko/ Ung. Dationg I; Kadarko/ Ung. Dationg II; Kadarko/ Ung. Awan Yada; Kadarko/ Ung. Ango; Bukuluwo/ Bukuluwo; Dusai/ Dusai Dung; Dusai/ Dagat Masaba; Tachira/ Sarki-Akut I; Tachira/ Sarki-Akut II; Tachira/ Dakhat; Dusai/ Dung 'B'
Kaura	Mallagum	Mallagum I/ Uug. Nni Sofa; Mallagum I/ Ung. Bako Akut; Mallagum II/ Ung. Sofa Buki; Mallagum II/ Ung. Alkali; Mallagum II/ Ung. Magaji Gankon; Mallagum II/ Ung. Shemang; Tum/ Ung. Magaji Tum; Tum/ Ung. Sabanet; Mallagum I/ Ung. Utung; Tum/ Ung. Katung; Mallagum II/ Ung. Alkali 'B'; Mallagum II/ Ung. Kasuwa
Kaura	Manchok	Manchok/ Ung. Aba Dube I; Manchok/ Ung. Aba Dube II; Manchok/ Nadabo Duniya I; Manchok/ Nadabo Duniya II; Manchok/ Usman Mutuwa; Manchok/ Kazah Dube; Manchok/ Ung. Kali Magaji; Manchok/ Buba Duniya; Radiam/ Ninyo Allah; Radiam/ Keta Duniya; Mahuta/ Dauda Zwanden; Mahuta/ Ayuba Nuhu; Kajim/ Dabo Yashim; Manhock/ (B. Adan) Bobai Adam; Manhock/ Umaru Shemang; Bungen/ Avong Ninyio; Manhock/ Ung. Liman; Manhock/ Ung. Bwanhot; Manhock/ Ung. Achai
Kaura	Bondon	Matwak/ Ung. Matwak Giwa; Matwak/ Ung. Matwak Rimi; Matwak/ Ung. Bature Lekwot; Matwak/ Ung. Aba Shemang; Bondon I/ Nuhu Duniya I; Bondon I/ Nuhu Duniya II; Bondon II/ Mba Nkom; Bondon/ Mangai Kambai; Akan/N/Gata/ Ung. N/Gata; Bondon I/ Ung. Raymond Agang; Bondon I/ Ung. Tabat Mamman; Bondon I/ Sankwai; Bondon I/ Dankat/Kura I; Bondon I/ Dankat/Kura II; Bondon I/ Ung. Akan Daadu; Bondon I/ Ung. Maji; Bondon I/ Yohanna Zaki; Bondon I/ Magaji Ayakwat; Bondon I/ Musa Akut; Bondon I/ Ung. Adamu Amwai; Bondon I/ Ung. Tsonbuiwanu
Kaura	Kaura	Kaura/ Ung. Abagai; Kaura/ Zakka Avong; Kaura/ Ninyio/Z/Nkom; Kaura/ Bamayi Niniyio I; Kaura/ Bamayi Niniyio II; Antrung/ Peter Laki; Antrung/ Nkom Bakwap; Antrung/ Yashim Utung; Antrung/ Ngu Achi; Giza Gwai/ Saliyat Gankon I; Giza Gwai/ Saliyat Gankon II; Antrung/ Ali Tabio; Giza Gwai/ Shebayan; Giza Gwai/ Daniel Bamai; Kaura/ Ada Bonnet; Kaura/ Sharubutu Zwahu; Kaura/ Yangyok Bakwap; Giza Gwai/ Nka
Kaura	Zankan	Zankan/ Ung. Kazzah Agang; Zankan/ Kuhiyep Agang; Zankan/ Alak Kanwai; Zankan/ Banhot Ninyio; Fadan Attakar/ Andong Billy; Mifi Attakar/ Simon Bagai; Mifi Attakar/ Aje Bakwap; Mifi Attakar/ Yusuf Ilong; Mifi Attakar/ Casimia; Mifi Attakar/ Kahu; Fadan Attakar/ Ishaya Tiyagnet; Fadan Attakar/ Sabastian U/Ashim; Zankan/ Mutua Kato; Sabon Gari/ Gaja Kaura; Sabon Gari/ John Achai; Zangang/ Shinkut Bakwap; Zangang/ Ashin Atung; Adu/ Ung. Leo Alat; Adu/ Ung. Yashim Tabat; Fadan Attakar/ Noga Avong`; Ung. Bognet Utuk/ Ung. Bognet Utuk
Kauru	Kauru West	An/Galadima Veterinary Office; Ang/Daki I Asibiti; Ang/Daki II K/Gidan M/Unguwa; Ang/Kauru L. E. A. Pry School; Ang/Dallah I K/G Maiunguwa; Ang/Dalla II Library; Danmaikogi L. E. A. Pry School; Kadi K. G Maiunguwa; Madachi L. E. A. Pry School; Rafin Iwa K/G Maiunguwa; Ang/Danbawa K/G/Maiunguwa; Dantidi K/G/ Maiunguwa; Kizanya K/G/ Mai Unguwa; Ang/Ganye K/Gmaiunguwa; Kwaba K/Gmaiunguwa
Kauru	Makami	Makami L. E. A. Pry School; Dandaura I L. E. A. Pry School; Dandaura II K/G Maiunguwa; Ang/Alhaji K/Gmaiunguwa; Ang/Noma L. E. A. Pry School; Ang/S. Wutana K/Gmaiunguwa; Gobirawa K/Gmaiunguwa; Barwa I L. E. A. Pry School; Barwa II L. E. A. Pry School; Kurminshado K/G Maiunguwa; Zakada K/Gmaiunguwa; Ang/Todo K/Gmaiunguwa; Furana K/Gmaiunguwa; Ang/Bala K/Gmaiunguwa; Kwanarufa, I K/G Maiunguwa
Kauru	Kwassam	Kwassam I L. E. A. Pry Sch; Kwassam Clinic; Fagen Rawa K/G Maiunguwa; Fadanruruma L. E. A. Pry School; Rafinrimi K/G Maiunguwa; Kuyanbana L. E. A. Pry School; Galadimawa I L. E. A. Pry School; Galadimawa II L. E. A. Pry School; Garmadi L. E. A. Pry School; Kaguta K/Gmaiunguwa; Kubau K/G Maiunguwa; T/Wada Garmadi K/Gmaiunguwa; Akansa K/Gmaiunguwa; Katuri K/Gmaiunguwa; Ang/Madaki Kwassam K/Gmaiunguwa; Kitimi L. E. A. Pry Sch
Kauru	Bital	Bital L. E. A. Pry School; Kaibi L. E. A. Pry School; Kuzamani L. E. A. Pry School; Kinugu L. E. A. Pry School; Bikal K/G Maiunguwa; Rishina L. E. A. Pry School; Kusheka I L. E. A. Pry School; Kusheka II L. E. A. Pry School; Tishen K/G Maiunguwa; Ung/S/Baka K/G Mai Unguwa; Surubunda K/G Mai Unguwa; Kugeran Dutse K/G Mai Unguwa; Fadan Rishiwa K/G/ Mai Unguwa; Kiwallo L. E. A. Pry School; Kushari L. E. A. Pry School; Kiban Gari; Kinono K/G Maiunguwa; Farin Dutse K/G Maiunguewa; Ung/Idi K/G Mai Unguwa; Apapa K/G Mai Unguwa
Kauru	Geshere	Geshere I/ L. E. A. Pry. Sch.; Geshere II/ L. E. A. Pry. Sch.; Geshere II/ K/G Maiunguwa; Karkun Kasa/ K/G Maiunguwa; Majagada/ L. E. A. Pri. Sch.; Binawa/ L. E. A. Pri. Sch.; Kabene I/ L. E. A. Pri. Sch.; Kabene II/ L. E. A. Pri. Sch.; Tunkuri/ K/G Maiunguwa; Fadan Kono/ L. E. A. Pri. Sch.; Kiwafa/ K/G Mai Unguwa; Gwandara/ K/G Mai Unguwa; Kimuru/ K/G Mai Unguwa; Ang/S. Kurya/ K/G Mai Unguwa; Dingi/ K/G Mai Unguwa; Zamfur/ K/G Mai Unguwa; Asake/ K/G Mai Unguwa; Babban Rumbu
Kauru	Damakasuwa	Fadan Chawai/ L. E. A. Pry. Sch.; Ribang/ L. E. A. Pry. Sch.; Ang/Sabo/ L. E. A. Pry. Sch.; Talo/ L. E. A. Pry. Sch.; Ang/Maraya/ L. E. A. Pry. Sch.; Ang/Gizo/ K/G Mai Unguwa; Damakasuwa I/ L. E. A. Pry. Sch.; Damakasuwa II/ L. E. A. Pry. Sch.; Rafin Gora/ L. E. A. Pry. Sch.; Izam/ L. E. A. Pry. Sch.; D/Kasuwa Kurama/ L. E. A. Pry. Sch.; Kibobi/ K/G Mai Unguwa; Ang/Yakubu/ K/G Mai Unguwa; Kirinkwa/ K/G Mai Unguwa
Kauru	Badurum Sama	Bakin Kogi/ L. E. A. Pry. Sch.; Kizaza/ L. E. A. Pry. Sch.; Kitibin/ K/G Mai Unguwa; Kirachi/ K/G Mai Unguwa; Danfani/ K/G Mai Unguwa; Kurmin Ruwa/ L. E. A. Pry. Sch.; Akoloko/ L. E. A. Pry. Sch.; Ang/Gaiya/ L. E. A. Pry. Sch.; Badurun Sama/ L. E. A. Pry. Sch.; Badurun Kasa I/ L. E. A. Pry. Sch.; Badurun Kasa II/ L. E. A. Pry. Sch.; Kurmin Risga I/ L. E. A. Pry. Sch.; Ang/Makama/ L. E. A. Pry. Sch.; Ang/Madaki/ K/G Mai Unguwa; Bari/ K/G Mai Unguwa; Kanzbuwa/ K/G Mai Unguwa; Kurmin Risga II/ Primary School
Kauru	Kamaru	Ang/Rimi I/ L. E. A. Pri. Sch.; Kizakoro/ L. E. A. Pri. Sch.; Kamaru/ L. E. A. Pry. Sch.; Kitantsa/ K/G Mai Unguwa; Kishosho/ K/G Mai Unguwa; Kikwane/ K/G Mai Unguwa; Kikoba I/ L. E. A. Pri. Sch.; Kikoba II/ L. E. A. Pri. Sch.; Kiririn/ L. E. A Pri. Sch.; Kidundun/ K/G Mai Unguwa; Kigas/ K/G Mai Unguwa; Warfi/ K/G Mai Unguwa; Kitakum/ K/G Mai Unguwa; Ang/Magaji/ K/G Mai Unguwa
Kauru	Pari	Pari I/ L. E. A. Pri. Sch.; Pari II/ L. E. A. Pri. Sch.; Ikulu/ L. E. A. Pry. Sch.; Ang/Madaki/ L. E. A. Pry. Sch.; Kiffin Bayero/ L. E. A. Pry. Sch.; Kigum/ L. E. A. Pry. Sch.; Lungu/ L. E. A. Pry. Sch.; Rahama/ L. E. A. Pry. Sch.; Chori; Kizachi Adam/ K/G Mai Unguwa; Kizachi Dawai/ K/G Mai Unguwa; Ang/Garma/ K/G Mai Unguwa; Ang/Kaya/ K/G Mai Unguwa; Ang/Galadima/ K/G Mai Unguwa
Kauru	Kauru East	Kagadama I/ L. E. A. Pry. Sch.; Kagadama II/ L. E. A. Pry. Sch.; Kahuta/ L. E. A. Pry. Sch.; Ibada I/ L. E. A. Pry. Sch.; Ibada II/ L. E. A. Pry. Sch.; Yadi/ K/G Mai Unguwa; Ang/Sallau/ K/G Mai Unguwa; Sabon Kaura/ K/G Mai Unguwa; Jaton Doka/ L. E. A. Pry. Sch.; Gidan Ali/ K/G Mai Unguwa; Ang/Kanawa/ K/G Mai Unguwa; Kauran Dawa/ K/G Mai Unguwa; Dokan Buhari/ K/G Mai Unguwa
Kubau	Kubau	Kubau East I/ Pri. Sch.; Kubau East II/ Pri. Sch.; Kubau West/ Pri. Sch.; Kubau South I/ Kofar M/Ung.; Kubau South II/ Kofar M/Ung.; Kutatolo Kg Ung; Ung. Karofi/ K/G Unguwa; Kutattato/ K/G Unguwa; Randa/ K/G Unguwa; Ung. Kafi/ K/G Unguwa
Kubau	Dutsen Wai	Ung. Makama I/ K/G Unguwa; Ung. Makama II/ K/G Unguwa; Ung. Asibiti I/ Dispensary; Ung. Asibiti II/ Pri. Sch.; Ung. S. Adamu I/ Pri. Sch.; Ung. S. Adamu II/ Pri. Sch.; Ung. Liman I/ Pri. Sch.; Ung. Liman II/ Pri. Sch.; Bawada/ K/G Unguwan; Hayin Gada/ K/G Unguwan; Ung. Magajin Gari/ K/G Unguwa; Ung. M. Yau/ K/G Unguwa; Maiyashi I/ Pri. Sch.; Maiyashi II/ Pri. Sch.; Kinkirmi/ K/G Unguwa; Kuli I/ Pri. Sch.; Kuli II/ K/G Unguwa
Kubau	Pambegua	Ung. Magaji 1/Near Ferti Store; Ung. Magaji II/ Near Ferti Store; Ung. Magaji III/ Near Ferti Store; Ung. Chiroma I/ Pri. Sch.; Ung. Chiroma II/ Pri. Sch.; Ung. Ade/ C. P. S. Pambegua; Ung. Sarki/ Pri. Sch.; Ung. Makama I/ C. P. S. Pambegua; Ung. Makama II/ C. P. S. Pambegua; Ung. Makama III/ C. P. S. Pambegua; Wawan Rafi/ K/G Unguwa; Ung. Nuhu I/ K/G Unguwa; Danmaliki I/ Pri. Sch.; Danmaliki II/ Pri. Sch.; Ung. Galadima/ K/G Unguwa; Zango/ K/G Unguwa; Kargi/ K/G Unguwa; Yalwa/ K/G Unguwa; Ung. Guza/ K/G Unguwa; Sabon Layi Tafiyau/ Pri. Sch.; Madaki/ K/G Unguwa; Ung. Danwada/ K/G Unguwa; Ung. Baso/ K/G Unguwa; Ung. Kakale/ Pri. Sch.; Ung. Nuhu II/ K/G Unguwa
Kubau	Zuntu	Zuntu East I/ Adult Education Class; Zuntu East II/ Adult Education Class; Ung. Galadima/ Pri. Sch.; Maikajin Jiri/ Pri. Sch.; Pallanki/ Pri. Sch.; Ung. Toro I/ K/G Unguwa; Ung. Toro II/ K/G Unguwa; Wazabi/ Pri. Sch.; Ung. Gashi/ K/G Unguwa; Dalman/ Pri. Sch.; Ung. Mai Gizo/ K/G Unguwa; Maikaza/ K/G Unguwa; Dankande/ Pri. Sch.; Tafar Far/ K/G Unguwa; Tafan Jama/ K/G Unguwa; Ung. Dankali/ K/G Unguwa; Kurmin Rogo/ K/G Unguwa; Zuntu West I/ Pri. Sch.; Zuntu West II/ Pri. Sch.; Zuntu West III/ Pri. Sch.
Kubau	Damau	Damau I/ Pri. Sch.; Damau II/ Pri. Sch.; Damau III/ Pri. Sch.; Gandari/ Pri. Sch.; Danhauya/ K/G Unguwa; Binigi/ K/G Unguwa; Kwainu/ K/G Unguwa; Masoba/ K/G Unguwa; Rinkyu/ K/G Unguwa; Jangaba/ K/G Unguwa; Maitunku/ K/G Unguwa; Dokoki/ K/G Unguwa; Hayin Fulani/ Cattle Ranch; Leren Dutse/ Pri. Sch.; Hayin Musa/ Dispensary; Bolan Hausawa/ K/G Unguwa; Wagaho/ Pri. Sch.; Masama/ K/G Unguwa; Bugum/ K/G Unguwa; Zanzari/ K/G Unguwa; Ruwan Sanyi/ K/G Unguwa
Kubau	Karreh	Karreh North/ K/G Unguwa; Karreh Ung. Sarki/ Pri. Sch.; Karreh South/ Pri. Sch.; Gaja Gaja I/ K/G Unguwa; Gaja Gaja II/ K/G Unguwa; Maikalangu/ K/G Unguwa; Matangi/ Pri. Sch.; Kadawa/ K/G Unguwa; Rafin Dodo/ K/G Unguwa; Hayin Dogo/ Pri. Sch.; Nasaru I/ Pri. Sch.; Nasaru II/ Pri. Sch.; Danladi I/ Pri. Sch.; Danladi II/ Pri. Sch.; Ung. Mato/ K/G Unguwa; Ung. S. Baka/ K/G Unguwa; Kamfanin Jidda/ K/G Unguwa
Kubau	Anchau	Tsohon Gari Kwari I/ Adult Edu. Class; Tsohon Gari Kwari II/ Pri. Sch.; Tsohon Gari Kwari III/ Pri. Sch.; Ung. Tudu I/ Pri. Sch.; Ung. Tudu II/ Pri. Sch.; Ung. Gata/ Pri. Sch.; Ung. Adamu/ K/G Unguwa; Takalafia West/ Pri. Sch.; Takalafia I/ C. P. S. Takalafia; Takalafia II/ C. P. S. Takalafia; Takalafia III/ Home Econ. Centre; Takalafia IV/ K/G Sarki; Rafin Busa/ K/G Unguwa; Ung. Dantani/ K/G Unguwa; Kuzuntu/ K/G Unguwa; Magami Tsohowa/ K/G Unguwa; Magami Sabuwa/ K/G Unguwa; Ung. Maiyashi/ K/G Unguwa; Jenau/ Pri. Sch.; Rufana/ K/G Unguwa; Maikalangu/ Pri. Sch.; Gidan Mai Auduga/ K/G Unguwa; Sabon Garin Kuzuntu/ K/G Unguwa
Kubau	Haskiya	Haskiya/ Pri. Sch.; Kudumi/ Pri. Sch.; Kambu/ K/G Unguwa; Kwando/ K/G Unguwa; Kanwa/ K/G Unguwa; Ung. Bala/ K/G Unguwa; Chikaji/ K/G Unguwa; Ranau/ K/G Unguwa; Yardoka/ K/G Unguwa; Tashar Kinchin/ K/G Unguwa; Tashar Tsamiya/ K/G Unguwa; Gatarawa/ K/G Unguwa; Bugau I/ Pri. Sch.; Bugau II/ Pri. Sch.; Mabuga/ K/G Unguwa; Wadaka/ K/G Unguwa; Kagadama/ K/G Unguwa; Tashar Maigora/ K/G Unguwa; Dori/ K/G Unguwa; Yalwa/ K/G Unguwa; Salihawa/ K/G Unguwa
Kubau	Kargi	Kargi Gabas I/ Pri. Sch.; Kargi Gabas II/ Pri. Sch.; Kargi Yamma/ Adult Edu. Class; Ung. Karofi I/ Tsoho Kasuwa; Ung. Karofi II/ Tsoho Kasuwa; Ung. Sidi/ Pri. Sch.; Marmara/ Pri. Sch.; Gedage/ Pri. Sch.; Dasa/ Pri. Sch.; Karaba/ Pri. Sch.; Bakara/ Pri. Sch.; Dangachi/ Pri. Sch.; Dokan Toro/ Pri. Sch.; Kajigi/ Pri. Sch.; Ung. Madaki/ K/G Unguwa; Kayarda/ K/G Unguwa; Shararriya/ K/G Unguwa; Ung. Fada/ K/G Unguwa; Pangwani/ Pri. Sch.; Gadas/ K/G Unguwa; Labi/ Pri. Sch.; Gurjiya/ Pri. Sch.; Kariya/ Pri. Sch.; Malikanchin - Gadas/ Pri. Sch.; Ung. Gayya/ Pri. Sch.; Rumawa/ Pri. Sch.; Ung. Dan Asabe/ K/G Unguwa; Ung. Masama/ K/G Unguwa; Ung. Kwanga/ K/G Unguwa; Ware - Ware/ K/G Unguwa
Kubau	Mah	Mah I/ Pri. Sch.; Mah II/ K/G Unguwa; Bagwiwa/ Pri. Sch.; Kuraye/ Pri. Sch.; Dokan Tagwai/ Pri. Sch.; Charika/ Pri. Sch.; Ung. Mantau/ K/G Unguwa; Kulin Mah/ K/G Unguwa; Dokan Rago/ K/G Unguwa; Rikochi Tsohuwa/ Pri. Sch.; Rikochi Sabuwa/ K/G Unguwa; Ung. Talata I/ Pri. Sch.; Ung. Talata II/ Pri. Sch.; Agalawa/ K/G Unguwa; Ung. Maikano/ K/G Unguwa
Kudan	Kudan	Kofar Gabas I/ Pri. Sch. K/Gabas; Ung. S. Fada/ Pri. Sch. Kudan; Ung. Tsauni/ Kgm Tsauni; Ung. Makera/ Kgm Makera; Nasarawan Kudan/ Pri. Sch.; Bakin Kasuwa I/ L. E. A. Pri. Sch.; Kofar Fada I/ Dispensary; Damaski/ Kgm Damaski; Matarawa/ Kgm Matarawa; Fannu/ Kgm Fannu; Kofar Gabas II/ L. E. A. Primary School; Kofar Fada II/ Television Viewing Centre; Bakin Kasuwa II/ Dispensary; Kofar Arewa/ Tatibu; Ung. Zabi/ Television Viewing Centre; Ung S. Pawa; Ung. Kuka/ Kgm Kuka; Ung. Danbirni/ Kgm Danbirni; Ung. Malamai/ Kgm Malamai; Ung. Saidawa/ Saidawa; Ung. Rimi/ Kgm Rimi; Ung. Makera II/ Kgm Makera; Kofar Gabas II/ Kg. Alh. Dankande
Kudan	Hunkuyi	Ung. Geme/ Television Viewing Center; Kofar Arewa I / Primary School Domoso; Ung. Fulani/ Kgm Fulani; Bakin Kasuwa/ Kgm Bakin Kasuwa; Ung. Wali/ Pri. Sch. Domoso; Ung. Sako/ Kgm Sako; Danzanka/ Kgm Danzanka; Kofar Kudu/ Kgm K/ Kudu; Ung. Sa. I/ Kgm Sa. I; Ung. Sadau/ Kgm. Sadau; Ung. Runji/ Kgm Runji; Ung. Waziri I/ Kgm Waziri; Kofar Arewa II/ Pri. Sch. Domoso; Ung. Sarki/ Television Viewing Centre; Ung. Malamai I/ Kgm Malamai; Kofar Yamma/ Central Pri. Sch.; Ung. Magina/ Central Pri. Sch.; Ung. Majema/ Kgm Majema; Ung. Waziri II/ K/M Waziri; Ung. Malamai II/ K/M Malamai
Kudan	Sabon Gari Hunkuyi	Ung. Mudi/ Kgm Mudi; Maraban Danja I/ Kgm M/Danja; Ung. Kyaudai/ Kgm Kyaudai; Ung. Ango/ Kgm Ango; Ung. Jaja I/ Pri. Sch. Jaja; Ung. Danlami/ Kgm Danlami; Ung. Makama/ Kgm Makama; Maraban Danja II/ Pri. Sch. M/Danja; Musawa I/ Pri. Sch. Musawa; Musawa II/ Kgm Musawa; Dufa - Dufa/ Kgm Dufa - Dufa; Danbami I/ Pri. Sch. Danbami; Dumuga II/Kgm Dumuga; Dumuga/ Kgm Dumuga; Ung. Jarmai/ Kgm Jarmai; Ung. Dantsoho/ Kgm Dantsoho; Ung. Jaja II/ Kgm Makada
Kudan	Likoro	Ung. Hayatu I/ Kgm Hayatu; Ung. Hayatu II/ Kgm Hayatu; Ung. Sarki/ Kgm Sarki; Ung. Iya/ Kgm Iya; Ung. Liman/ Kgm Liman; Ung. Makera/ Kgm Makera; Ung. Kushigi/ Kgm Kushigi; Ung. Karimu/ Kgm Karimu; Rafin Kira/ Kgm R/Kira; Ung. Kurna/ Pri. Sch. Likoro; Ung. Makama/ Kgm Makama; Makwalla/ Kgm Makwalla; Ung. S. Pawa/ Kgm S. Pawa; Kofar Arewa/ Clinic; Bakin Kasuwa/ Kgm B/Kasuwa; Ung. Kurna II/ Pri. Sch. Likoro; Ung. Karofi/ Kgm Karofi; Ung. Makera II/ Kgm Makera; Ung. Sarki II/ L. E. A. Pri. Sch. U/Iya
Kudan	Taban Sani	Bagaddi Mudi/ Kgm Bagaddi; Likoro Tasha/ Kgm L/Tasha; Kada - Kada I/ Pri. Sch. K/Kada; Ung. Nomau/ Kgm Nomau; Kada Kada II/ Kgm Kada Kada; Mahuta Gari I/ Pri. Sch. Mahuta; Ung. Sarki/ Pri. Sch. T/Sani; Ung. Galadima/ Kgm Galadima; Dantaro/ Kgm Dantoro; Ung. Garba/ Kgm Garba; Ung. Makera/ Kgm Makera; Ung. Gudugu/ Kgm Gudugu; Ung. Masassaka/ Kgm Masassaka; Ung. Dankala/ Kgm Dankala; Mahuta Gari II/ Pri. Sch. Mahuta; Ung. Sharu/ Kgm Sharu; Ung. Sarki II/ L. E. A. Pri. Sch.
Kudan	Kauran Wali North	Ung. Sarki/ Dispensary; Ung. Liman/ Adult Education Class; Ung. Hamidu/ Pri. Sch.; Ung. Rumi I/ Kgm Rumi; Ung. Amadu/ Kgm Amadu; Ung. Tata/ Kgm Tata; Ung. Sanda/ Kgm Sanda; Ung. Wali/ Pri. Sch.; Ung. Maryamu/ Kgm Maryamu; Ung. Rumi II/ Kgm Rumi
Kudan	Kauran Wali South	Ung. Danjuma/ Kgm Danjuma; Ung. Dangashi/ Pri. Sch.; Ung. Sadau I/ Kgm Sadau; Ung. Dandabo/ Kgm Dandabo; Ung. Pawa/ Kgm Pawa; Ung. Bawa/ Kgm Bawa; Ung. Karofi/ Kgm Karofi; Ung. Bakoshi/ Kgm Bakoshi; Ung. Sadau II/ K/M Sadau
Lere	Sabon Birnin	Juran Kari/ Juran Kari L. E. A.; U/Kanci/Yadi/ L. E. A. Yadi; U/Boka/ K/Gidan Maiunguwa; U/Zakari/ K/Gidan Maiunguwa; Danjaba/ L. E. A. Danjaba; Kwaftara/ K/Gidan Maiunguwa; Damau/ L. E. A. Damau; Marji/Ung. Adamu/ K/Gidan Maiunguwa; Ung/Dawa Gari/ U/Bawa L. E. A.; U/Bawa Lowcost/ L. E. A. Ung. Bawa; U/Bawa Jumare G. R. A./ L. E. A. Ung. Jumare; U/Bawa Tasha I/ K/Gidan Alh. Inuwa; U/Bawa Tasha II/ K/Gidan Hajiya Zuwaira; U/Bawa Tasha II/ K/Gidan Barde; Sabon Birnin/ L. E. A. Sabon Birnin; Kofar Bakoshi/Yanbita/ L. E. A. K/Bakoshi; Ung. Waziri/ L. E. A. Ung. Waziri; Malali/ L. E. A. Malali; Jaja/ K. Gidan Maiunguwa; Ung. Alhaji Mato/ K/Gidan Alh. Mato; Ung. Mele/Ung. Kura/ L. E. A. Ung. Mele; Ung. Mato/ L. E. A. Ung. Mato; Karau- Karau/S/Bayi/ K. Gidan Maiunguwa; Fafin Duhu/Ung. Rimi/ L. E. A. R/Bulu
Lere	Yar Kasuwa	Bisallah/ L. E. A. Bisallah; Mishawa/L. E. A. Bisallah; Yarkasuwa/ Tasha; Ung. Dankano/ Motorpark; Ayama 1/ L. E. A. Ayama; Ayama II/ Dispensary Goje; Yankaura/ Ung. Sale/Sarki House; Ung. Dogara/ N/Maiunguwa House; Ung. Sarki/ N/Maiunguwa House; Ung./Ishaya/ N/Maiunguwa House; Maigoma I/ L. E. A. Maigoma; Maigoma II/ L. E. A. Maigoma; Jankasa/ L. E. A. Jankasa; Ayama III/ L. E. A Ayama; Rumaya/ L. E. Arumaya; Kargi/ Near Sarki Kargi House; Ukissa Gari/ L. E. A. Ukissa; Ung. Mungu/ K/Gidan Luka/ L. E. A. Ashama; Ashema/ L. E. A. Ashama; Wuroko/ L. E. A. Wuroko; Ung. Magaji/ N/Maiunguwa House; Kudaru I/ L. E. A. Kudaru; Kudaru II/ L. E. A. Kudaru; Bitarana/ L. E. A. Bitarana; Aganduwa/ N/Maiunguwa House; Babban Gida / Babban Gida; Ung. Sale Abundu/ K/Gidan Maiunguwa Sale; Wuroko II/ L. E. A. Wuroko; Ung. Sale Abundu K/Gidan Maiunguwa Sale
Lere	Kayarda	Goron Dutse/ L. E. A. Goron Dutse; Ung. Inusa/ K/Maiunguwa; Tudun Wada/ K/Maiunguwa; Makaranta Kaku/ L. E. A. Kaku; Ung. Sarki Kaku/ K/Maiunguwa; Jankanwa/ Watara/ L. E. A. Jankanwa; Ung. Maiabdu Kaayarda/ L. E. A. Kayarda; Tsurutawa Ung. Sadi Kayarda/ L. E. A. Kayarda; Ung. Sarkin Kayarda I/ L. E. A. Kayarda; Ung. Sarkin Kayard II/ L. E. A. Kayarda; Kayarda Tasha/ K/Gidan Maiunguwa; Malumfashi/ K. Gidan Maiunguwa; Gama M. Datti/ K. Gidan Maiunguwa; Tsurutawa/ L. E. A. Tsurutawa; Ung. Alhaji Kimba/ L. E. A. Ung Alhaji; Kadugu/ K/Gidan Maiunguwa; Were/ L. E. A. Awolu; Payan/ L. E. A. Payan; Watara/ L. E. A. Watara
Lere	Lere	Ung. Dodo/Pata/ L. E. A. Ung. Dodo; Gamagira/ Near Maiunguwa House; Jurawa/ N/ Le. A. Rowa; Ung. Sarkin Lere/ N/Sarki House; Ung. Liman/ N/Sarki House; Ung. Sarkin Pawa/ Dispensary; Ung. Kanawa/ Maiunguwa House; Ung. Jika/Lugura/ N/Maiunguwa House; Kairan Dangambo/ N/Maiunguwa House; Ung. Sarkin Dan Alhaji I/ Dan Alhaji L. E. A.; Ung. Sarkin Dan Alhaji II/ N/Maiunguwa House; Isurutawa/ N/Maiunguwa House; Sigau I/ L. E. A. Sigau; Sigau II/ Hayin Maje; Sigau III/ L. E. A. Sigau
Lere	Ramin Kura	Ung. Sarkin Ramin Kura/ L. E. A. Ramin Kura; Ramin Kura I/K/Gidan Maiunguwa; Ramin Kura II/ Near Maiunguwa House; Luwuna/ L. E. A Luwuna; Ragwa/ Nea Maiunguwa House; Gasakora/Reaw/ L. E. A. Gasakora; Rimin Karu III/ Saki M/ House; Ung. Madugu/Kadage/ Near Maiunguwa House; Dogan Daji/Rimi/ L. E. A. Dogandaji; Nazangi/ Near Maiunguwa House; Ung. Pah/Ung. Sahwara/ L. E. A. Ung. Pah; Jingre/Dondori/ L. E. A. Jingre; Kargi/ L. E. A. Kargi; Ung. S/R/Kura/ L. E. A. Rimin Kura; Ramin Kura IV/ K/G/Maiunguwa; Ramin Kura V/ Sarki M/House
Lere	Saminaka	Ung. Sarki I/ Near Sarkin Saminaka House; Ung. Sarki II/ Television Center; Ung. Tanimu I/ L. E. A. Saminaka; Ung. Tanimu II/ L. E. A. Saminaka; Ung. Liman/ N/Hudu M/Wuta's House; Ung. Tiyaye/ District Head Office; Ung. Inuwa Maidoki, Home Economics House; Saminaka Tasha I/ N/Alh. Dogara House; Saminaka Tasha II/ N/Maiunguwa House; Ung. Hassah I N/Hassah Maireke House; Ung. Hassah II/ N/Ayada'shouse; Ung. Kanawa/ Motor Park Gadagada; Ung. Tanimu Tasha/ K/Gidan Hadssah Yanbiyu; Ung. Kwalokwalo/ K/Gidan Kwalokwalo; Katirji I/ K/D Gambo Malami; Katirji II/ K/Gidan Ade; Ung. Adamu I/ Asibitin Yara; Ung. Adamu II/ Asibitin Yara; Ung. Adamu III/ Asibitin Yara; Ung. Kakondi/ Kofar Gidan Abasiyia; Ung. Danladi I/ Mango T. V. Center; Ung. Danladi II/Old Rest House; Nasarawa I/ K/Gidan Maiunguwa; Nasarawa II/ Yan Kara
Lere	Lazuru	Lazuru/ L. E. A. Lazuru; Waila/ K. Maiunguwa; Karfe/ Leren Mata/ K/Maiunguwa; Bauda/ Bauda L. E. A.; Tudun Fulani/ M/Unguwa; Krosha/ L. E. A. Krosha; Kankare/ L. E. A. Kankare; Kwanan Bauda/ K/Maiunguwa; Kafin Lazuru/ K/Maiunguwa; Wabba/R/Gwaza /K/Maiunguwa; Tudai Il. E. A. Tudai; Tudai II /L. E. A. Tudai; Kafin Tudai / L. E. A. Tudai; Ung. Makera /L. E. A. Tudai; Belnenu /K/ Maiunguwa; Ishame/ L. E. Aishami; Kanfani Amali/Ung. Sarki /L. E. A Kamfani; Babban Fadam /L. E. A./B/Fadama; Ung. Tambaya /L. E. A. Ung. Tambaya; Gidan Dutse /K. Maiunguwa; Rafin Gari /K. Maiunguwa; Doka I/K. Maiunguwa; Doka II/K. Maiunguwa; Ung. Sarkin Doka /L. E. A. Doka; Amawa /K/Maiunguwa; Jaja/Uyago/Bumbi/ K/Maiunguwa; Maibindiga/ K. Maiunguwa; Ung. Tambaya II/ L. E. A. Gun. Tambaya; Ung. Sarkin Doka II/ L. E. Adoka
Lere	Abadawa	Abadawa/ L. E. A. Abadawa; Hayin Gada/ L. E. A. Rahama; Lagga/ L. E. A. Laga; Kawuce/K/ Abadawa/ K/Gm/Unguwa; Ung. Magaji /K/Gm/Unguwa; Maresu/ L. E. A. Maresu; Tsurutawan Maresu/ L. E. A. Tsurutawan Maresu; Sheni/ L. E. A. Shani; Kunkunu/ K/Gm/Unguwan; Domawa/Kauyawi K/Gidan Mai Unguwa; Kauran M. Umaru/ L. E. A. Kauran M/Umaru; Kantan/ L. E. A. Kantan; Tashandorora/ K/Gidan Maiunguwa House; Dano /L. E. A. Dano; Federe /L. E. A. Federe; Tudun Federe/ L. E. A. Federe; Kwayan L. E. A. K/G Maiunguwa; Sabonfili/ L. E. A. Fili; Famayaji/ Near Maiunguwa House; Kururuwa/ Near Maiunguwa House
Lere	Dan Alhaji	Ung. Sarkin Dan Alhaji I/ Old Dispensary; Ung. Sarkin Dan Alhaji II/ T. V. Center; Ung. Madaki/ K/Gidan Mai Unguwa; Ung. Ahl. Isa/ L. E. Aung. Isa; Agaji L. E. A Agaji; Tsangayan Sule/ K/Gidan Maiunguwa; Doka/ L. E. A. Doka; Kaura/ K./Gidan Unguwa; Tandama/ L. E. A. Tandama; Katare/ K/Ggidan Maiunguwa; K/Galma/K Sada/ K/Gidan Maiunguwa; Jahunu/ K/Gidan Maiunguewa; Kakun Sama/ L. E. A. Kaku; Wawan Rafi /K/Gidan Maiunguwa; Maskawa I/ L. E. A. Maskawa; Maskawa II/ L. E. A. Maskawa; Jura /L. E. A. Jura; Kurmi Jele Tsamiya/ K/Gidan Maiunguwa; Kaffanuwa/ L. E. A. Kaffanuwa; Mahanga/Tabo-Tabo/ K/Gidan Maiunguwa; Coroshal/ K/Gidan Maiunguwa
Lere	Gure/Kahugu	Kakumu/ K/Gidan Maiunguaw; Kadigi /Kitimi/ L. E. A. Kitimi; Kitimi/ L. E. A Kitimi; Pada I/ Home Economics; Pada II/ Home Economics; Natari/ L. E. A. Natari; Udami/ L. E. A. Udami; Mayala I/ K/Maiunguwa; Kakidari I/ L. E. A. Kakidari; Kakidari II/ L. E. A. Kakidari; Ung. Sarkin Aliyu / K/Maiunguwa; Abarna/ L. E. A. Abarna; Ung. Sarkin Kahugu/L. E. A. Fadan Kahugu; Ung. Sarkin Maito/Maidodo /Neark. Maiunguwa; Tugora/ K. Maiunguwa; Kakunga/ Affiliated School; Ung. Bagudu/Bundu Kahugu /L. E. A. Bundu; Dingin Kahuwa/ L. E. A. M/Unguwa; Kinigu Kasuwa/ L. E. A. Kinugu; Ung. Noba/ L. E. A. Noba; Ung. Pah /L. E. A. Ung. Pah; Bundu Walikurama /K/Maiunguwa; Bundu /L. E. A. Bundu; Kussan /Affiliated School
Makarfi	Makarfi	Makarfi Tsowuwa/ B/Tso Huwar Kasuwa; Makarfi I Area Court; Makarfi II/Central Primary School Makarfi; Makarfi III/ Sada Pri, Sch; Ang Geri/ K/M/Geri; Ang Kari I/ K/M/Muhammed Unkari; Ang Sako I/K/M/Yusi; Ang Sako II/ Agric Dept; Ang Hudu /K/M/Hudu; Makarfi T/Kasuwa II/ K/Malam Bashiru; Kofar Kudu /Km Liman; Ang Kari II/ K/M Ango; Makarfi IV Area Court; Makarfi V/ Central Primary School; Ung. Kari III/K/M Muhammed; Makarfi Tsohuwa II/Tsohuwar Kasuwa
Makarfi	Tudun Wada	Ang Sanda/ K/M Sanda; Tudun Wada I/ Makarfi Clinic; Tudun Wada I/ Gdss Tudun Wada; Ang Dadin - Kowa/ Pri. Sch. Dadin Kowa; Sabon Gari/ Reader Room; Dambakwa/ K/M Tabanya; Hausawa Road/ K/M Na'aji; Babban Gida/ K/M Babban Gida; Tudun Wada III/ Post Office; Agn Uku/ K/M Dogara; Layin Kwastan/ K/M Dangarba; Ung. Uku II/ K/M Dangarba
Makarfi	Gazara	Gazara Gari I/ Health Clinic; Gazara Gari II/ Pri. Sch. Gazara; Ang. Goda I/ Pri. Sch. Goda; Ang. Madaki/ K. M. Madaki; Ang. Buzu/ K. M Buzu; Ang. Mal. Yusuf/ K. M Yusuf; Ang. Wambal/ K. M Wambal; Ang. Sarki Gazara/ K. M Hussaini; Ang. Jama'a/ Pri. Sch. Jama'a; Gangara Gari I/ Pri. Sch. Gangara; Gangara Gari II/ K. M. Gangara; Kadabo/ Pri. Sch. Kadabo; Makaurata I/ Pri. Sch. Makaurata; Makaurata II/ K. M. Makaurata; Ang. Mahangi/ Pri. Sch. Mahangi; Gana/ K. M. Gana; Gazara Gari II/Primary School Gazara; Ung. Jama'a II/ Pri. Sch. Jama'a
Makarfi	Danguziri	Ang. Sarki/ Pri. Sch. D/Zuru; Ang. Madaki/ Pri. Sch. D/Zuru; Agn. Makoyi D/Zuru/ K/M Makoyi; Danguziri/ K/M Danguziri; Ang. Danbakwa/ K/M Tambaya; Ang. Makera/ K/M Makera; Ang. Tamowa/ Pri. Sch. Tamowa; Ruma Gari I/ Pri. Sch. Ruma; Ruma Gari II/ Pri. Sch. Ruma; Ang. Bawa/ K/M Bawa; Ang. Maikuge/ K/M Maikuge; Ang. Bargi/ K/M Bargi; Ang. Dangambo/ K/M Dan Gambo; Ang. Bakoshi/ Pri. Sch. D/Nayamaka; Ang. Muryamu I/ K/M Muryamu; Ang. Masaka/ K/M Nasaka; Ung. Muriyamu II/ K/M Muriyamu
Makarfi	Gimi	Gimi Tasha I/ Pri. Sch. Gimi Tasha; Gimi Gari II/ Pri. Sch. Gimi Gari; Gimi Gari III/ Dispensary; Ang. Zarto/ K/M Zarto; Ang. Soko I/ Pri. Sch. Soko; Ang. Soko II/ K/M Soko; Ang. Fadama/ K/M Fadama; Ang. Ba'awa/ K/M Ba'awa; Tashar Yari/ K/M Tashar Yari; Gimi Gari III/ K/M Gimi Gari; Rahama Gari/ Pri. Sch. Rahama; Ang. Chakun/ K/M Chakun; Rahama Gari II/ Pri. Sch. Rahama; Kauyen Baki/ K/M Baki; Gimi Tasha II/ Pri. Sch. Gimi Tasha
Makarfi	Nassarawan Doya	Kofar Arewa/ Central Pri. Sch.; Ang. Waziri/ Dispensary; Ang. Madaki/ Pri. Sch. Madaki; Ang. Liman/ K. M Liman; Kofar Gabas/ K. M Gabas; Kwakware I/ Pri. Sch. Kwakware; Kwakware II/ K. M. Kwakware; Ang. Auduga I/ K. M Auduga; Ang. Auduga II/ K. M Auduga; Kofar Fada/ Kofar Fada; Kofar Yamma/ K. M Najuma; Kofar Arewa II/ Central Pri. School
Makarfi	Mayere	Ang. Sarkin Fada/ Pri. Sch. S/Fada; Ang. Makaranta/ Pri. Sch. Mayere; Ang. Shuaibu/ K. M Shuaibu; Ang. Madauchi/ K. M Madauchi; Ang. Bawa/ K. M Bawa; Ang. Karofi/ Pri. Sch. Karofi; Yarkasuwa/ K. M Yarkasuwa; Ba'awa/ K. M Ba'awa; Durum Gari I/ Pri. Sch. Durum; Durum Gari II/ K. M. Durum; Ang. Juma/ Pri. Sch. A/Juma; Kanakargo/ K. M Kanakargo; Charwa/ K. M Charwa; Dankware/ K. M Dankware; Maigadi/ K. M Maigadi; Kwalo/ K. M Kwalo; Ung. Makaranta II/ Pri. Sch. Mayere
Makarfi	Gubuchi	Ang. S. Fada I/ T. V. Centre; Ang. S. Fada II/ K. M S. Fada; Gubuchi Gari III/ Pri. Sch. Gubuchi; Ang. Galadima/ Pri. Sch. Gubuchi; Ang. Shuaibu/ Health Clinic; Ang. Danju/ K. M Danju; Ang. Hari/ K. M Hari; Ang. Kakale/ K. M Kakale; Ang. Salmanu/ K. M Salmanu; Ang. Maiturawa/ Pri. Sch. M/Rawa; Ang. Kanawa/ K. M Kanawa; Ang. Dandoka/ K. M Dandoka; Ang. Barbashi/ K. M Barbashi; Ang. Tarai/ K. M Tarai; Ang. Gogarma/ K. M Dauda; Ang. Sarkin Yaki/ K. M Sarkin Yaki; Ung. S/Fada II/ T. V. Centre; Ung. Shuaibu II/ Health Clinic
Makarfi	Gwanki	Gwanki Gari I/ Gwanki Pri. School; Gwanki Gari II/ Gwanki Pri. School; Danhodi/ K. M Danhodi; Kunkumi I/ Pri. Sch. Kunkumi; Kunkumi II/ K. M. Kunkumi; Bakutaje/ Pri. Sch. Bakutaje; Ang. Falke/ K. M Falke; Tafida I/ Pri. Sch. Tafida; Tafida II/ K. M. Tafida; Tudun Doka/ K. M Tudun Doka; Ang. Dabo/ K. M Dabo; Ang. Yaro/ K. M Yaro; Dorayi Gari I/ Pri. Sch. Dorayi; Dorayi Gari II/ K. M. Dorayi; Ang. Barau/ K. M Barau; Ang. Kwado/ K. M Kwado; Ang. Danlami/ K. M Danlami; Gwanki Gari III/ Gwanki Pri. Sch.
Makarfi	Dandamisa	Ang. Sarki D/Misa/ Pri. Sch. Dandamisa; Ang. Dada/ K. M Dada; Ang. Magaji/ K. M Magaji; Ang. Mikailu/ K. M Mikailu; Ang. Tanko D/Misa/ K. M Dandamisa; Dandamisa/ Pri. Sch. Dandamisa; Ang. Sarki Marke I/ K. M Marke; Marke Gari/ Ppri. Sch. Marke; Marke Tasha/ Health Clinic Marke; Katukawa I/ K. M Katukawa; Sabon Garin Daji I/ Pri. Sch. S/Daji; Sabon Gari Daji II/ K. M Sabon Gari Daji; Aba Malam/ K. M Aba Malam; Ang. Makera/ K. M Makera; Katukawa II/ K. M Katukawa; Ang. Sarki Marke II/ K. M Marke; Ung. Sarki D/Damisa/ Pri. Sch. D/Damisa
Sabon Gari	Samaru	Danraka Estate I/ Behind Union Bank; Danraka Estate II/ By Kwakware; Danyaro Road/ By Durumi; Tunau Road/ Tunau House; Dandafo Road/ By Dunya Tree; Ahmed Road/ Ahmed Road; Yusuf I/ Yusuf Road; Yusuf II/ Yusuf Road; Sarki Road I/ By Sarki House; Sarki Road II/ By Independence Cinema; Naibi Road/ Naibi House; Masallari Road I/ L. G. A. Saidu; Masallari Road II/ L. G. A. Saidu; Ahim Basawa Road/ Gindin Mangoro; Makaranta Road I/ L. G. A. Amina; Makaranta Road II/ L. G. A. Amina; New Extension/ L. E. A Amina; Habibu Road/ Biye House; Leather Research/ Admin Block; Iya Road/ By Kasuwan Dare; Agric Quarters/ L. E. A. Amina; Daraka Estate 111/ Behind Union Bank; Sarki Road 111/ By Sarki House
Sabon Gari	Jama'a	Akenzua Hall/ Police Gate Abu; Suleiman Hall/ Suleiman Dinning Hall; Amina Hall/ Amina Dinning Hall; Senior Staff Quarters/ Staff Quarters; Danfodio Hall/ Dinning Hall; Alexander Hall/ Ribado Common Room; Ramat Hall/ Ramat Hall; Karaye/ Mango Tree; Jama'a/ L. E. A. Jama'a; Ung. Danyero/ Bakin Kwakware; Zangon Shanu I/ Aviation Gate 2; Silver Jubilee/ Football Field; A. B. U./ Demonstration School; Zangon Shanu II/ Alhudahuta Gate; Hayin Liman/ Liman House; Kwarin Kubanni/ Mai Angwan House; Industrial Dev. Centre/ Admin Block; Police Gate/ Police Gate (Abu); Abu Dam Quarters/ Abu Staff School; Zangon Shanu III/ Aviation Gate II
Sabon Gari	Bomo	Bomo Village/ Makaranta Arabic; Kwakware Manu/ Barkin Titi; Bomo Kaya/ Mangwaron Yusuf; Bomo Village I/ L. E. A. Bomo; Bomo Gari/ Gindin Chedinya; Hayin Sambo/ Gindin Mangwaro; Dansa'a/ L. E. A Dansa'a; Kurmin Bomo/ K/G Yusha'U; Ung. Gwaiba/ K/G M/Anguwa; Mil Gwoma Gari/ L. E. A. Mil Gwoma; Area C Abu/ Opposite Maintenance Office; Area Bz Abu/ Bz Round About; Area Eg Abu/ Golden Nursery School; Dorawa Road/ Hayin Dogo; Basawa Road/ Kwakware Chemist; Kano Road/ Ggss Samaru; Uban Doma Road/ Near Railway Line; Mamman Yola Road/ Bakin Shago; Nashukan Road/ Bakin Kasuwa; Yan Mangworo/ Yan Mangworo; Dorawa Road/ Bakin Kasuwa; Kowa Store/ L. E. A. Kallon Kura; Galadima Road/ K/G Mai Angwan; Yaro Road/ Yaro Bomo House; Bomo Kaya/ G/Sarkin House; Area Es II/ Abu, Zaria
Sabon Gari	Basawa	Fed. Govt. Girls College/ Admin Block; Nat. Inst. Leather Research/ Admin Block; Basawa L. G. A I/ L. E. A. Basawa; Ung. Sarki/ K/G Sarki; Basawa/ K/G Makama; K/G Liman/ Danladi; Ung. Gobirawa/ L. E. A. Basawa; Hayin Yamma/ Hayi; Dupa Dupa/ Amfani House; Basawa/ L. E. A. Barracks; Tudun Muntsira/ Tudun Muntsira; Unguwan Makera/ Makera House; Unguwan Na'Inna/ Na'Inna House; Unguwan Rimi/ U. P. E Ung Rimi; Gindin Durumi/ Gindin Durumi; Kofar Kudu/ Kofan Kudu; Palladan/ K/G Sarkin Palladan; Gindin Mangwaro Layin Zomo/ K/G M. Dahiru; Sarkin Baka Road/ K/G Sarkin Baka; Gindin Tsamia/ Hayin Liman; Reader Room/ Hayin Liman; Aviation Gate/ Aviation Gate; Ung. Fulani/ L. E. A. Palladan; Nainna/ L. E. A. Palladan; Basawa II/ L. E. A. Barracks
Sabon Gari	Chikaji	Chikaji Youth Club/ B7 Bala Mai Albasa; Chikaji Sabon Layi/ L. E. A. Chikaji; Chikaji Polo/ By Musa Burabisco; Chikaji Gari/ By Mai Kifi Road; Bakin Dogo/ Commerce School; Chikaji/ By Dantine Maikifi; Bandale Road/ By Bandale House; Chikaji/ By Beauty Guest Inn; Mtd Barracks/ Mtd Barracks; Dururmi; Ggss Dogon Bauchi/ Ggss Dogon Bauchi; Old Hospital Road/ Ggss Dogon Bauchi; Warri Street/ By 21 Mai Guzami House; Lagos Street I/ By 21 Mai Guzami House; Lagos Street II/ By Alangade House; New Hospital Road/ Hospital Road; Yoruba Street/ By Rimi; Calaber Streeti/ Health Office; Kalaber Street II/ By Area Court; Kalaber Street III/ By Iya Office; Mamman Club/ By Mamman Daku Club; Main Market/ By Police Station; Mamman Daku Street/ Ggss Dogon Bauchi; Yan Awaki/ By Mobil Filling Station; Chikaji Youth Club II/ B7 Bala Mai Albasa
Sabon Gari	Muchia	Babban Titi/ By Alh. Katango House; Aggrey/ Himma Club; Kasim/Prince Road/ Mai Bala House; Ali Baba Street/ L. E. A. Muchia; Zobe/Bidda Road/ L. E. A. Muchia; Yaba/Yan Awaki/ Yan Amaki; Durumin Baba Mai Albasa/ D/Baba M Albasa; Madugu Road/ Madugu Road; Bankole Road/ Hajiya Habiba House; Enugu Road/ No. 2 Enugu Road; Durumi Sabbi/ By Durumi; Tobacco Road/ Tobacco Road; Dorawa Road/ K/G Sarki Muchia; Bindare Road/ By Kwakware; Ondo Road/ Ondo Road; Abba Road/ By Sani Abba House; Tsugugi Central/ Alh. Wakili House; Onitsha Road/ Abdul Wakili House; Galma Road/ Red House; Sapele/Dikko Road/ K/G Sarki; Ung. Tsauni/ By Isiyaka Mai Nama; Shika Road/ Dan Lami Ali House; Victoria/Prince Road/ L. E. A. Marmara; Marmara/ Ibadan Street/ L. E. A. Marmara; Liman Street/ Liman Street; Uche Portharcourt Road/ Uche Road; Kings Road I/ H/Court; Kings Road II/ L. E. A. S/Gari; Prince Road/ L. E. A. Marmara; Ung. Dankuka/ No. 6 Tsugugi; Ali Baba Street II/ L. E. A. Muchia
Sabon Gari	Jushin Waje	Ung. Mai Sule/ By Kwakware; Ung. Mai Gwando I/ L. E. A. Jushin Waje; Ung. Mai Gwando/ Ashiru Maimagani House; Liman Saidu Road/ Liman House; Rsm Kumasi/ Yan Mangori; Bamidele Street/ Bamidele Street; Tanko Street/ L. E. A. Ung. Kanawa; Ung. Kanawa/ L. E. A. Ung. Kanawa; Hajiya Street/ Army Children School; Mochu Street/ Army Children School; Alhaji Street/ Army Children School; Bello Street/ Army Children School; Ung. Fulani/ L. E. A. Ang Fulani; Ung Abdul Tela/ Abdul Tela House; Musa Street/ By Sikerie House; Army Depot (Ss Quarters)/ By Senior Staff Qtrs; Army Depot/ By Warrant Officers Qtrs; Nms Students/ By Nms Staff Qtrs; Nms Student/ By School Field; Gdss Chindith/ Gdss Chindith; Nms Workshop/ Nms Workshop; Ungwar Kanawa II/ Army Children's School
Sabon Gari	Hanwa	Danladi Gangare/ K/G Alh Audu Concord; Rafin Sidi/ Makera; Ung Sarki/ K/G Sarki; Hanwa/ Upe Hanwa; Makaranta/ K/G Alh Ahmadu; Ung Nashuka/ Ung Nashuka; Jim Harrison Hotel/ Harrison Hotel Gate; Yan Lemu/ Yan Lemu; Hanwa Lowcost I/ Zaria Hotel Gate; Hanwa Lowcost II/ 10a Lowcost; Kwarin Ayuba/ Gindin Kuka; Gidan Dan Tanko/ K/G Dantanko; Bakin Kora/ Kwangila; Ung Mal. Sani I/ Upe Kwangila; Ung Mal. Sani II/ K/G Malam Sani; Liverpool Avenue/ Fascomgate; Manchester Street/ Manchester Street; Park Road/ Hamzeh Store; Circular Road/ Union Bank Site; Commonwealth Road/ Govt. Lodge Z4; Hanwa Road/ Farm Seed House; Rock Road/ Rock Road; Sokoto Road I/ Mayfair Clinic; Sokoto Road II/ Nepa Bus Stop; Barma Road/ Barma Road; Rafin Sidi II/ Makera; Hanwa Makera/ K/G Mai Anguwan
Sabon Gari	Dogarawa	Dogarawa I/ Chikin Gari; Ung Fulani/ L. E. A. Ang Fulani; Ung Alh Barau/ K/G Alh Barau Diko; Kabama Ranji/ K/G Chindo; Dogarawa/ K/G Mai Anguwan; Ung Nomi/ Nomi House; Kwanta Reshe/ K/G Mai Anguwan; Ung Sakadadi/ Upe Sakadadi; Ung Sarki/ Upe Sakadadi; Ung Mal Isa/ K/G Mal Isa; Dan Mai Kwaruwa/ Maishellaro House; Ung Barashi/ Ung Barashi; Ung Sarki/ K/G Sarki; Gwanda/ Gindin Rimi Karofi; Bauda/ K/G Mai Anguwan; Zangon Dan Barno/ Upe Zangon Dan Barno; Gabashin Gwanda/ Gwanda; Gwanda Village/ K/G Mai Anguwan; Gwanda/ Ung Madaki; Dogarawa II/ Tanko House
Sabon Gari	Unguwan Gabas	Club Street I/ Recreation Club; Club Street II/ Cemetery Junction; Benin Street I/ Zumunta Social Club; Benin Street II/ Janex; Railway Qrts. I/ Recreation Railway Club; Railway Qrts. II/ Dogon Bauchi Junction; Ung Jaba Market/ Sal Mai Shayi House; Ung Jaba I/ S. Baba House; Ung Jaba II/ Hausa; Jeka Da Kwarin Ka/ Sule Dandaudu; Jeka Da Kwarin Ka/ U/Line; Jeka Da Kwarin Ka/ W/Line; Ung Jaba/ G/Mai Anguwa; T. Line/ Late Zakari Magwaro; Saidu Street/ Japan Electronics; Freetown Street/ Freetown Street; Rimi Street/ L. E. A. Ja'afaru; Nupe/Calabar Street/ No. 8 Nupe Street; Bigman Street/ Area Garden; Ja'afan Street/ L. E. A. Ja'afaru; Egbo Road/ L. E. A. Ja'afaru; William Street/ K/G Lawal Maitaba; Bigman Street II/ Area Garden; Ibo Road II/ L. E. A. Jafaru
Sanga	Gwantu	Gwantu I; Gwantu II; Gwantu III; Ung Dakaci; Gwantu Kurmi; Ung Maikasa I; Ung Hausawa; Anakpara; Zange; Ung Galadima; Ung Ninzam; Ung Maikasa II
Sanga	Fadan Karshi	Fadan Karshi I; Fadan Karshi II/ Motor Park; Sabon Gida I; Sabon Gida II; K/Goro Sarki; Gimi; Bom; Karshi Daji; Ung Ibrahim; Tudun Wada Karshi; K/Goro Titi; Fadan Karshi III/Kabamu; Dogon Daji
Sanga	Ayu	Mayir; Tayu; Agamati; Tugon; Atili; Babur; Anka/Fatu; Ung Mamman; Ung Kako; Ung Gimba; Mayir II/Mayir
Sanga	Ninzam North	Fadan Wate; Maitozo; Kwassu; Kwasu Titi; Ninche; Ung Kaura I; Sambe; Dorowa; Kwassu II; Ung Kaura II
Sanga	Ninzam South	Amar Dogo; Kontangora; Amar Lada; Konkikiri; Telekpo; Ragga; Abu Makaranta; Abu Gari
Sanga	Bokana	Ammantu; Fadan Ayu I; Fadan Ayu II; Mantur; Ung Mada; Ung Madaki; Ung Nungu; Ung Tanimu; Ammantu II; Sansani
Sanga	Aboro	Aboro; Ajangwai; Antur; Kutal; Kubal; Gongoro; No. 6; Ung Tukura; Ung Mallam Musa; Ung Runmbu; Ajangwai II; Ung Tukura II
Sanga	Ninzam West	Randa I; Ung Gwanda; Antishi; Maitakama; Landa I; Makeri; Gajere I; Godo; Zambur; Ancha I; Anzere; Tattaura; Gajere II; Randa II; Anzere Nihan
Sanga	Wasa Station	Anji; Kajar; Wurro Andaha; Pantinya; Kwakwasa; Ung Hausawa I; Ung Jirgi; Ung Musulumi; Wasa Station; Ung Hausawa II
Sanga	Arak	Ung Madaki; Janda; Gbonkok; T. Kulere; Essen (Wakili); Ankwa; Arak I; Langa I; Nunukwauchu; Sanga; Tsauni Majidadi; Ambe; Ankolo; Aban; Ung Giginya; Kiban; Langa II
Sanga	Nandu	Ung Sarki Nandu; Kobin; Numbu; Dangam; Gani Sarki; Gani Madaki; Tudun Wada; Agom; Ung Maikaho; Wambe; Ung Gobe; Numbu Dagaci; Ung. Sarki Nandu II
Soba	Maigana	Ung. Dallatu/ K. G Dallatu; Ung. Fulani, Ung. Fulani; Ung Sarkin Maigana/ Kofar Sarki; Upe Maigana, Upe Maigana; Bauda/Kadage/ K. G. Alh. Dauda; Ung. Kwadaro/ K. G Maianguwa; Ung. Tofa/ L. E. A. Tofa; Ung. Rimi, Ung. Rimi; Shamaki/ Area Court; Tudun Saibu/ L. E. A. Tudun Saibu; Kadp/Gardado/Arabic School; Ung. Waziri/Fulani/ K. G. Nagunda; Ung. Busa/ K. G Busa; Yalwan Kajan/Kgy/Gajan; Sawaya/ K. G Sawaya; S/Garin Matari/ L. E. A. Matari; Fada Matari/ Fada; Ung. D/Yakasai/ K. G Maianguwa; L. E. A. Yakasai, L. E. A. Yakasai; Rimi Yakasai/ Rimi; Tashan Kaya/ K. G Maianguwa; Ung. Sarkin Maigana II/ K. G Maianguwa; Tofa L. E. A./ K. G Maianguwa
Soba	Kinkiba	Ung. Sarki; L. E. A. Kinkiba; Ung. Maude; Ung Kudu, Ung Kudu; Ung. Kwari, Ung. Kwari; Alhazawa Taba, Alhazawa Taba; Wanka Kinkiba/ Wanka; Ung. Makwarwa/ Un. Makarwa; Ung. Damari/ Damari; Ung. S/Fagaci/ L. E. A. Fagaci; Dangaladima/ Gobirawa; Fagaci Tsohuwa, Fagaci Tsohuwa; L. E. A. Marwa/ L. E. A. Marwa; Doka, Doka; Dumaru, Dumaru; Ung. Sako/ Un. Sako; Ung. Hamida/ K. G Maiangwa; Ung. Makada/ K. G Maiangwa; Ung. Iro Kwari II/ K. G. Maiangwa
Soba	Gimba	Bakin Kasuwa/ L. E. A. Gimba; Ung. Kanawa/ Tsamiya; Ung. Liman, Ung. Liman; Ung. Hayin Allahuwa/ Hayin Allahuwa; Ung. S/Lawur, Ung. S/Lawur; Ung. B. Tanko, Ung. B. Tanko; Ung. Gora, Ung. Gora; Ung. Mahauta, Ung. Mahauta; Ung. Lalli, Ung. Lalli; Ung. Mafera, Ung. Mafera; Ung. S/Magada/ Ung. Sarki; Ung. Haske, Ung. Haske; Ung. G/Kwano Awai, Ung. G/Kwano Awai; L. E. A. Wanka; Sabon Layi/ Ung. Awai; Ung. Zumaila, Ung. Zumaila; Ung. Bagaldi/ L. E. A. Bagaldi; Ung. Tsamiya, Ung. Tsamiya; Ung. Sakaru/ Sakaru; Ung. Liman Wanka/ Ung. Liman; Ung. Sarkin Awai, Ung. Sarkin Awai; Ung. Sarkin Gimba, Ung. Sarkin Gimba; Ung. Alewa/ L. E. A. Alewa; Ung. Kurmin Bakano/ K. G. Maianguwa; Ung. Kanawa II/ K. G. Maianguwa; Ung. Mahauta II/ K. G. Maianguwa
Soba	Kwassallo	Kwassalo/ L. E. A. Kwassalo; Ung. Kago/ L. E. A. Kago; Ung. S/Gwarzo, Ung. S/Gwarzo; Ung. S/Maguzawa, Ung. S/Gwarzo; Ung. Tukur, Ung. Tukur; Ung. Wambai, Ung. Wambai; Ung. Bature, Ung. Bature; Ung. Suddu/ L. E. A. Suddu; Ung. Liman, Ung. Liman; Ung. Sambirni, Ung. Sambirni; Ung. S. Liman, Ung. S. Liman; Ung. Sarkin Taba/ L. E. A Taba; Ung. Karofi, Ung. Karofi; Ung. Saddi, Ung. Saddi; Ung. Kurungufi, Ung. Kurungufi; Ung. Karsawa, Ung. Karsawa; Ung. Dinya Gari/ L. E. A. Dinya; Ung. S/Dinya, Ung. S/Dinya; Ung. Tukur Fada II/ K/G Mai Anguwa
Soba	Richifa	Ung. Turaki, Ung. Turaki; Ung. Makama, Ung. Makama; Ung. Chiroma, Ung. Chiroma; Ung Kuzai, Ung Kuzai; Ung. Bakuntu, Ung. Bakuntu; Ung. Farin Kasa/ L. E. A. Farin Kasa; Ung. Garba, Ung. Garba; Ung. Liman, Ung. Liman; Ung. Madaki, Ung. Madaki; Ung. Magadda, Ung. Magadda; Ung. Alhazawa/ L. E. A. Alhazawa; Ung. S/Richifa/ S/Richifa; Ung. S/Farin Kasa/ S/Farin Kasa; Magadda II/ K/G Maianguwa
Soba	Gamagira	Gamagira/ L. E. A. G/Gira; Ung. S/Gamagira/ T. V. Centre; Ung. Fulani/ K/G Mai Anguwa; Taman Sama/ L. E. A. Tama; Danjaba/ L. E. A. Danjaba; Ung. S/Danjaba/ K. S. Danjaba; Ung. Katsinawa, Ung. Katsinawa; Ung. Wadaza/ L. E. A. Wadaza; Gurbabiya/ L. E. A. Gurbabiya; Kadage, Kadage; Ung. Makada/ K. G Maianguwa; Ung. Auta; Ung. Dokan Itu, Ung. Dokan Itu; Ung. Liman Ibada/ Liman Ibada; Ung. Mahauta/ K. Maianguwa; Ung. Jaba/ K. Maianguwa
Soba	Dan Wata	Dan Wata Gari/ L. E. A. D/Wata; Sarkin D/Wata/ Kofar Fada; Ung. Fulani/ K. G Mai Anguwa; Ung. Tauga/ K. G Mai Anguwa; Ung. Sobawa/ K. G Mai Anguwa; Ung. Mu'Azu/ K. G Mai Anguwa; Yalwan D/Wata/ L. E. A. D/Wata; Maizare/ K. G. Mai Anguwa; L. E. A. T/Lafiya/ L. E. A. T/Lafiya; Lungu T/Lafiya/ L. E. A Lungu; Ung. S/Taka Lafiya/ Kofar Fada; Ung. Alhaji Sale/ K. G Maianguwa; Ung. Maitalata/ K. G Maianguwa; Ung. Biram/ K. G Maianguwa; Ung. Dankande/ K. G Maianguwa; Ung. Marke/ K. G Maianguwa; Ung. Barau; Ung. Lungu II/ K. G Maianguwa
Soba	Turawa	Turuwa Gari/ L. E. A. Turawa; Ung. Dankande/ K. G Maianguwa; Ung. Galadima/ K. G Maianguwa; Ung. M/Lemu/ L. E. A M/Lemu; Ung. Madaki/ L. E. A. Madaki; Ung. Hajja/ K. G Maianguwa; Ung. Gargari/ K. G Maianguwa; Ung. Maizadu/ K. G Maianguwa; Ung. Kiri/ K. G Maianguwa; Ung. Garga/ K. G Maianguwa; Ung. Madarzai/ L. E. A Madarzai; Ung. Majidadi/ K. G Maianguwa; Ung. Liman/ K. G Maianguwa; Ung. S/Madarzai/ Fadan Sarki; Ung. Sarkin Noma/ K. G Maianguwa; Ung. Dangana Galadima II/ K. G Maianguwa
Soba	Soba	Soba Gari/ T. V. Centre; Ung. Lungu Soba/ L. E. A Lungu; Sharehu/ Area Court; Ung. Sarkin Tasha/ Bus Stop; Ung. Umar/ L. E. A T/Jirgi; Yusuf Na Kyauta/ K. Yusuf N/Kyauta; Ung. Tudun Wada I/ Central. Pri. Soba; Ung. Pampo/ K. G Maianguwa; Ung. Kuyamutsa/ K. G Maianguwa; Ung. Dogo/ K. G Maianguwa; Ung. Idi/ L. E. A. Ung. Idi; Ung. Shalabari/ L. E. A. Shalabari; Ung. Kaware; Ung. Yalwan Sarki/ K. G Maianguwa; Ung. Yalwan Bene/ L. E. A. Bene; Ung. Yalwan Makaranta/ L. E. A. Makaranta; Ung Kukori/Lea Kukoki; Ung. Dan Isa I/ L. E. A Dan Isa; Ung. Dan Isa II/ K. G. Maianguwa; Ung. Alabura/ Ung. Alabura; Ung. Hayin M. Garba/ New Market; Ung. Kurmi/ L. E. A. Kurmi; Ung. Rimi/ Soba M. Clinic; Ung. Tudun Wada II/ K. G Maianguwa; Ung. Dan Isa II/ K. G Maianguwa; Ung. Yusuf Nakyauta II/ K. G Maianguwa; Soba Gari II/ K. G Maianguwa
Soba	Garun Gwanki	Garu Tsohuwa/ K. G Maianguwa; Garu S/Gari/ L. E. A. Garu; Ung. Rabo/ K. G Maianguwa; Ung. Lado/ K. G Maianguwa; Ung. Dodo/ K. G Maianguwa; Ung. Katsinawa/ K. G Maianguwa; Ung. Bakura Gari/ L. E. A. Bakura; Ung. Kwalliya Gari/ L. E. A. Kwalliya; Ung. Dankaka/ K. G Maianguwa; Ung. Makama S./ L. E. A. Makama S.; Ung. Sharifai Gari/ L. E. A. Sharifai; Ung. Galadima/ K. G Maianguwa; Ung. Liman/ K. G Maianguwa; Ung. Doka/ L. E. A Doka; Ung. Takalafiya; Ung. Baban Tata/ K. G Maianguwa; Ung. Bele Gari/ L. E. A. Bele; Ung. Ya'U Bele K. G. Mai Anguwa; Garu Tsohuwa II/ K. G Maianguwa
Zangon Kataf	Zonzon	Mashan Daji/ L. E. A. Pri. Sch.; Mashan/ L. E. A. Pri. Sch.; Mabuhu/ L. E. A. Pri. Sch.; Wawa Rafi/ L. E. A. Pri. Sch.; Runji/ L. E. A. Pri. Sch.; Sakum/ L. E. A. Pri. Sch.; Ung. Kaya I/ L. E. A. Pri. Sch.; Ung. Kaya II/ L. E. A. Pri. Sch.; Maitiye/ L. E. A. Pri. Sch.; Ung. Ruhogo/ L. E. A. Pri. Sch; Sako/ L. E. A. Pri. Sch.; Ung. Fama Bakin Kogi/ L. E. A. Pri. Sch.; Zarkwai/ L. E. A. Pri. Sch.; Surubu/ L. E. A. Pri. Sch.; Tali Gan/ L. E. A. Pri. Sch.; Magamiya I/ L. E. A. Pri. Sch.; Magamiya II/ L. E. A. Pri. Sch.; Magamiya III/ L. E. A. Pri. Sch.; Gidan Wuka I/ L. E. A. Pri. Sch.; Gidan Wuka II/ L. E. A. Pri. Sch.; Ung. Tabo/ L. E. A. Pri. Sch.; Ung. Akama/ Kofar Gidan Akama; Ung. Kaya III/ Primary School
Zangon Kataf	Zaman Dabo	Zaman Dabo I/ L. E. A. Pri. Sch; Kurmin Masara/ L. E. A. Pri. Sch.; Jankasa I/ L. E. A Pri. Sch.; Jankasa II/ Garin Jankasa; Kanzankan/ L. E. A. Pri. Sch.; Ung. Doka/ Garin Ung. Doka; Ung. Galadima/ L. E. A. Pri. Sch; Zaman Awon/ L. E. A. Pri. Sch.; Tagamawai/ L. E. A Pri. Sch.; Kangwaza/ L. E. A. Pri. Sch.; Magadan Kuru/ L. E. A. Pri. Sch.; Kibori/ L. E. A. Pri. Sch.; Achisa/ Garin Achisa; Ung. Maichibi; Maleh/ Garin Maleh; Ung. Rude I/ L. E. A. Pri. School; Zaman Dabo II/ Pri. School
Zangon Kataf	Unguwar Gaiya	Tagama I/ L. E. A. Pri. Sch.; Ung. Juju/ Garin U/Juju; Fadan Tsoho/ Garin Fadan Tsoho; Samaru/ L. E. A. Pri. Sch.; Mabushi I/ L. E. A. Pri. Sch.; Mabushi II/ L. E. A. Pri. Sch.; Tange/ Garin Tange; Magata/ Garin Magata; Ung. Jaba I/ L. E. A. Pri. Sch.; Ung. Jaba II/ L. E. A. Pri. Sch.; Gidan Karau/ Garin Gidan Karau; Kacecere/ Garin Kacelere; Makwaku/ Garin Makwaku; Kurmin Dawaki/ L. E. A. Pri. Sch.; Samaru II/ Bakin Kasuwa; Ung. Allah Magani; Samaru III/ Samaru Junction; Tagama II/ Pri. School
Zangon Kataf	Zonkwa	Layin Shaba A./ P. H. C. (Clinic); Ung. Rama/ Near Alh. Kanori House; Zonkwa Tsakiya /Zon Lib; Zonkwa Tsakiya II/Near Islamiya; Ung. Dauke/ L. E. A. Pri. Sch. I; Ramai Daji/ L. E. A. Pri. Sch. I; Ung. Ishaku/ L. E. A. Pri. Sch. I; Ung. Danbaki, Ung. Danbaki; Ung. Aya, Ung. Aya; Ung. Asibiti/ L. E. A. Pri. Sch.; Madauchi/ L. E. A. Pri. Sch.; Kurmin B. I/ L. E. A. Pri. Sch.; Fadan Kaje/ G. S. S. Fadan Kaje; Tsohon Gida/ L. E. A. Pri. Sch.; Ramai Gida/ L. E. A. Pri. Sch.; Zonal Office I/ Zonal Office; Ung. Sanke/ L. E. A. Pri. Sch.; Ung. Sarki I/ L. E. A. Pri. Sch.; Ung. Sarki II/ Ung. Sarki; Ung. Christopher/ L. E. A. Pri. Sch.; Fadan Kaje Bijim II/Lea Pri Sch; Zonkwa Tsakiya II/Kofar Gida; Ung. Sanke II/ L. E. A. Pri. Sch.; Kurmin B II/ Zakwat; Ung. Asibiti St. Francis/ T. Francis College; Kurmin B III/ Ecwa School; Ung. Baptist I/ G. S. S. Zonkwa; Ung. Baptist II/ Primary School; Zonal Office II/ Bakin Kasuwa
Zangon Kataf	Madakiya	Attar I/ L. E. A. Pri. Sch.; Attar II/ L. E. A. Pri. Sch.; Zitti/ L. E. A. Pri. Sch.; Madakiya I/ G. S. S. Madakiya; Madakiya II/ L. E. A. Pri. Sch.; Tsoriyang I/ L. E. A. Pri. Sch.; Tsoriyang II/ L. E. A. Pri. Sch.; Aduwan I/ L. E. A. Pri. Sch.; Aduwan II/ L. E. A. Pri. Sch.; Wadon/ L. E. A. Pri. Sch.; Kankada I/ L. E. A. Pri. Sch.; Kankada II/ L. E. A. Pri. Sch.; Matsirga/ Gidan Matsirga; Ayagan/ Gidan Ayagan; Galadimawa/ Gidan Ayagan; Bankwa/ Gidan Ayagan; Maniya/ Gidan Ayagan; Aduwan III/ Primary School
Zangon Kataf	Unguwar Rimi	Ung. Sule/ L. E. A. Pri. Sch.; Afana Gida/ L. E. A. Pri. Sch.; Ung. Rimi Kaje/ L. E. A. Pri. Sch.; Ung. Hausawa I/ L. E. A. Pri. Sch.; Ung. Hausawa II/ L. E. A. Pri. Sch.; Sabon Gari/ L. E. A. Pri. Sch.; Bakin Kogi I/ L. E. A. Pri. Sch.; Bakin Kogi II/ L. E. A. Pri. Sch.; Chonchuk/ L. E. A. Pri. Sch.; Kunyai/ L. E. A. Pri. Sch.; Rikawan/ L. E. A. Pri. Sch.; Marsa I/ L. E. A. Pri. Sch.; Marsa II/ L. E. A. Pri. Sch.; Katsit Daji/ L. E. A. Pri. Sch.; Gidan Tagwai/ Kofar Gidan Tagwai; Ung. Auta/ L. E. A. Pri. Sch.; Ung. Sidi/ Kofar Gidan Sidi; Unguwar Hausawa III/ Primary School
Zangon Kataf	Gidan Jatau	Farman/ L. E. A. Pri. Sch.; Gidan Jatau/ L. E. A. Pri. Sch.; Abet Kufai/ L. E. A. Pri. Sch.; Abet/ L. E. A. Pri. Sch.; Kamuru Kaje I/ L. E. A. Pri. Sch.; Sakwak/ Gidan Sakwak; Kurdan/ L. E. A. Pri. Sch.; Zauru/ L. E. A. Pri. Sch.; Ifam/ L. E. A. Pri. Sch.; Marabang/ L. E. A. Pri. Sch.; Kanem/ L. E. A. Pri. Sch.; Avong/ L. E. A. Pri. Sch.; Kamuru Kaje II/ Pri. Sch.; Zuturung Tinta/ Garin Tinta; Zuturung Gida/ L. E. A. Pri. Sch.; Zuturung Gida II/ L. E. A. Pri. Sch.; Zuturung Gurara/ L. E. A. Pri. Sch; Zuturung Mago/ L. E. A. Pri. Sch.
Zangon Kataf	Kamantan	Fadan Kamantan/ L. E. A. Pri. Sch.; Kabam/ L. E. A. Pri. Sch.; Yangal/ L. E. A. Pri. Sch.; Kafom/ L. E. A. Pri. Sch.; Fadia Tudun Wada/ L. E. A. Pri. Sch.; Kanem/ L. E. A. Pri. Sch.; Fadia Bakut/Lea Pri School; Fadia Mugu Sarki/ L. E. A. Pri. Sch.; Gidan Maga/ L. E. A. Pri. Sch.; Ung. Boro/ L. E. A. Pri. Sch.; Kangun I/ L. E. A. Pri. Sch.; Riyam/ L. E. A. Pri. Sch.; Kagal I/ L. E. A. Pri. Sch.; Bale/ L. E. A. Pri. Sch.; Kanzir/ L. E. A. Pri. Sch.; Kamantan II/ Tsohuwar B/Kasuwa; Lenak/ L. E. A. Pri. Sch.; Kagal II/ Pri. Sch.; Kangun II/ Pri. School
Zangon Kataf	Kamuru Ikulu North	Kamulu Ikulu I/ Garin Ikulu; Kamulu Ikulu II/ L. E. A. Pri. Sch.; Fange/ Garin Fange; Kamuru Hausa/ L. E. A. Pri. Sch.; Kamuru Dutse/ L. E. A. Pri. Sch.; Ashafa/ Garin Ashafa; Zagom Gajere/ L. E. A. Pri. Sch.; Boto/ L. E. A. Pri. Sch.; Gidan Bako/ L. E. A. Pri. Sch.; Ung. Pah/ L. E. A. Pri. Sch.; Anchuna/ L. E. A. Pri. Sch.; Ung. Makama; Akupal/ L. E. A. Pri. Sch.; Fadan Ikulu/ L. E. A. Pri. Sch.; Gidan Ali/ L. E. A. Pri. Sch.; Ung. Toro/ L. E. A. Pri. Sch.; Dutsen Bako/ L. E. A. Pri. Sch.; Kolosok/ Garin Kolosok; Lisuru/Lea Pri Sch.; Sabon Kaura/ L. E. A. Pri. Sch.; Ung. Rana/ L. E. A. Pri. Sch.; Kamuru Dutse II/ Pri. School; Ashafa II/ Primary School
Zangon Kataf	Zango Urban	Fada/ Fada; Ung. Alkali/ Upper Area Court; Bakin Kasuwa I/ Bakin Kasuwa; Ung. Tudu/ Ung. Tudu; Rimin Duna/ Rimin Duna; Rimi/ Rimi; Ung. Liman Goma/ Ung. Liman Goma; Bakin Rafi/ L. E. A Pri. Sch.; Chakaikai, Chakaikai; Dargozo/ Dargozo; District/ District Office; Ung. Danbako/ Ung. Fulani; Library/ Reading Room; Bakin Kasuwa II/ Bakin Kasuwa
Zaria	Kwarbai A	Kwarbai I/ Pri. Sch. Madarkaci; Kwarbai II/ Pri. Sch. Madarkaci; Kwarbai III/ L. E. A. Fad Sonka; Kwarbai IV/ L. E. A. Fadi Sonka; Kwarbai V/ K/G M Gari; Jushi I/ L. E. A Jushi; Jushi II/ K/C M Ang.; Jushi III/ Gindin Itace L/Cost; Banzazzau I/ L. E. A B/Zazzau; Banzazzau II/ K/G M Anguwa; Ung. Katuka I/ K/C Madauchi; Ung. Katuka II/ K/C Madauchi; Ung. Katuka III/ L. E. A. Chidawaki; Ung. Aska I/ L. E. A. A. Kahu; Amaru I/ K/G Madaki Shehu; Amaru II/ K/G Madaki Shehu; Amaru III/ K/G Na Inda; Amaru IV/ K/G Na Inda; Ung. Lalle I/ K/G M. Ang.; Ung. Lalle II/ K/G M. Ang.; Makama Dodo I/ L. E. A. M. Dodo; Kofar Kona I/ L. E. A. K/Kona; Magajiya I/ K/G Adaki Saidu; Magajiya II/ L. E. A. Magajiya Pri.; Magajiya III/ L. E. A. Magajiya Pri.; Kwarbai VI/ L. E. A. Magajiya Pri.
Zaria	Kwarbai B	Pada I/ Gindin Gawo; Pada II/ L. E. A. Pada; Pada III/ L. E. A. Pada; Pada IV/ K/G Sankira; Babban Dodo I/ L. E. A. B/Dodo; Babban Dodo II/ L. E. A. B/Dodo; Babban Dodo III/ K/G Dallatu Samaila; Babban Dodo IV/ K/G Sa'I Lawal; Rimin Tsiwa I/ K/G Sani R/Tsiwa; Rimin Tsiwa II/ K/G Danmadami; Rimin Tsiwa III/ Rimin Tsiwa Estate; Rimin Tsiwa IV/ L. E. A. Rimin Tsiwa; Albarkawa I/ K/G Adabale; Albarkawa II/ K/G Sani Mai Yasin; Albarkawa III/ K/G Alkali Shu'Aibu; Albarkawa IV/ L. E. A. Office; Madaka I/ K/G Liman; Madaka II/ K/G Datti; Madaka III/ K/G Turaki Ali; Ung. Liman I/ L. E. A. A/Liman; Ung. Liman II/ L. E. A. A/Liman; Kofar Doka I/ K/G Tanko Kofa; Kofar Doka II/ K/G Tafarki; Kofar Doka III/ K/G Garba Kofa; Ang. Alkali I/ L. E. A. Ang. Alkali; Ang. Alkali II/ L. E. A. Ang. Alkali; Danmadami I/ K/G Sambo Dispenser; Danmadami II/ K/G Hussaini Mulki; Danmadami III/ K/G Isa Bagobiri; Lemu I/ L. E. A. Lemu; Lemu II/ L. E. A. Lemu; Lemu III/ Paradise Cinema; Ung. Liman III/ L. E. A. A/Liman
Zaria	Ung. Juma	Limanci I/ K/G Bala Iyali; Limanci II/ K/G M/Kasuwa; Limanci III/ K/G M/Kasuwa; K/Kuyambana I/ K/G Dogara; K/Kuyambana II/ K/G Kashim; K/Kuyambana III/ K/G D. Yaro; Yarbukka I/ K/G Ibrahim Dogara; Yarbukka II/ K/G Galadima; Yarbukka III/ K/G Abdu Hayatu; Danjinjiri I/ House No. 74; Danjinjiri II/ K/G Hassan Kudi; Ung. M. Sule I/ K/G Koli; Ung. M. Sule II/ K/G S. Kura; Iyanjuma I/ K/G Abu Sani; Iyanjuma II/ K/G Alhaji Sani; Ung. Juma I/ K/G Zubairu Sada; Ung. Juma II/ K/G Ahmadu; Ung. Juma III/ K/G Kira; Ung. Juma IV/ K/G D. Thoho G. Rimi; Ung. Juma V/ K/G Sani Hamza; Yarbukka IV/ K/G Abdu Hayatu
Zaria	Limancin-Kona	Kanfage I/ K/G Soron Sanyi; Kanfage II/ K/G Alh. Yaro Da Gari; Kanfage III/ K/G Tankon Mama; Salamanduna I/ K/G Pate; Salamanduna II/ Leprosy Clinic; Salamanduna III/ New Area Court; Ung. Rubu I/ K/G Lamido; Ung. Rubu II/ Off Maianguwa; Durumin Mai Garke/ District Head Office; Babban Gwani/ K/G Mai Anguwa; Ung. Sirdi/ K/G Sarkin Sirdi; Rimin Bingida I/ K/G Yayan Dela; Limanci Kona I/ K/G Mustafa D/Raka; Limanci Kona II/ K/G Mabuga; Ung. Nupawa I/ K/G Alkalin Ja'E; Ung. Nupawa II/ K/G Dan Kambari; Kwanmakama I/ K/G Liman; Kwanmakama II/ K/G Dillalai; Zangon Matamaki/ Zangon Mataimaki; Karauka I/ K/G Abdu Danbarno; Karauka II/ K/G Falalu Kafinta; Karauka III/ K/G Alh. Awwal Ibrahim; Karauka IV/ K/G Alh. Shittu Musa; Karauka V/ K/G Alh. Ibrahim Paki; Kusfa I / K/G Mush Maizare; Kusfa II/ K/G Isa M. Gari; Kusfai II/ K/G Abdu Mai Kare; Kusfa IV / Kg/ Katuka; Durumin Jamo I / K/G Sani Tanunda; Durumin Jamo II / K/G Alh. Ahmadu; Durumin Jamo III / K/G Dahiru Wali; Kusufa V/ Kg Sambo
Zaria	Gyallesu	Gyallesu I/ L. E. A Gyallesu; Gyallesu II/ L. E. A Gyallesu; Gyallesu III/ L. E. A Gyallesu; Wali Road/ (No. 28) K/G Abdu Bige; Madaki Road/ Adison Med. Store; Sarkin Yaki Road I/ (No. 1) Mangoron Andi; Sarkin Yaki Road II/ K/G Mal. Ali (No. 31); Malama Road I/ K/G Balarabe Kubau; Malama Road II/ K/G Liman; Congo Road/ Rimin Tsiwa Estate; Congo Gra/ Children's Park; Wtc/Atc Area/ Wtc/Atc Junction; Sabon Layi I/ Dakace Rd K/G Manu B/Nike; Sabon Layi II/ K/G Bawa Kugu; Nagoyi/ Ung. Kaya/ K/G Alh. Dari; K/Goyan Low Cost I/ Gindin Rimin Boka; K/Goyan Low Cost II/ Kdpdc Office; Ung. Sarkin Rafi/ K/G S/Rafi; Fage/Kako/ K/G Mal. Tanko Fage; Kogoro/ K/G Mai Anguwa; Fed. Coll. Of Education/ Fce Campus; Nagoyi/ Ung. Kayatu/ K/G Dari
Zaria	Ung. Fatika	Ung. Iya I/ L. E. A. Ung. Iya; Ung. Iya II/ K. G. Marafa; Ung. Iya III/ K. G. Rayyanu; Rimin Danza I/ K. G S. Bawa; Rimin Danza II/ K. G Y. Dozen; Marmara I/ Kasuwa Kauna; Marmara II/ K. G Bala Riti; Marmara III/ K. G Ahmadu; Ung. Fatika I/ L. E. A. Ung. Fatika; Ung. Fatika II/ K. G Samaila; Ung. Fatika III/ K. G Tanko; Ung. Fatika IV/ K. G Makama; Ung. Zaria I/ K. G. Alh. Dari; Ung. Zaria II/ K. G M. Hassan; Ung. Zaria III/ K. G M. Hassan; Kofar Jatau I/ L. E. A Kofar Jatau; Kofar Jatau II/ Kofar Jatau; Kofar Jatau III/ K. G Bala Tanki; Ung. Ali I/ K. G Wakilin Doka; Ung. Ali II/ K. G Madakin Kira; Kofar Jatau IV/ L. E. A. Kofar Jatau
Zaria	Tukur Tukur	Tukur Tukur I/ L. E. A. Tukur Tukur; Tukur Tukur II/ K. G Sarki T/Tukur; Tukur Tukur III/ G. Durmin Islamiya; Tukur Tukur IV/ Adult Education; Tudun Jukun I/ L. E. A Gaskiya; Tudun Jukun II/ L. Mahauta; Tudun Jukun III/ K/G Korau M. Kananzir; Tudun Jukun IV/ K/G Mohammed Bayi; Kwarin D. Goma I/ K/G M. Anguwa; Kwarin D. Goma II/J. S. S. T/Jukun; Kwarin D. Goma III/ L. E. A. T/Jukun; Sabuwan Ung. I/ K/G Bako Zuntu; Sabuwan Ung. II/ K/G Umar T/Jukun; Sabuwan Ung. III/ K/G Adamu M. Almajirai; Magume I/ Rahama Store; Magume II/ Poly Gate; Gaskiya I/ Gaskiya Village K/G H/Sale
Zaria	Dambo	Dambo I/ K/G Sarkin Dambo; Dambo II/ No. 8 Bamalli Road; Ung. S/Noma I/ L. E. A. Dambo; Ung. Katika I/ K/G Mai Anguwa; Fanganu/ K/G Mai Anguwa; Dambo III/ L. E. A. Dambo; Bizara I/ L. E. A. Bizara; Bizara II/ L. E. A. Bizara; Kusan Dambo/ K/G Mai Anguwa; Dakace I/ K/G Sarkin Dakace; Dakace II/ L. E. A. Dakace; Dakace III/ L. E. A. Dakace; Ung. Mangu/ K/G Maiunguwa; Ung. Gaga I/ K/G Maiunguwa; Ung. Gaga II/ K/G Maiunguwa; Kakeyi Village I/ L. E. A. Kakeyi; Kakeyi Village II/ L. E. A. Kakeyi; K/Mai Rogo Gaba/ K/G Alh. Salisu Kakeyi; Ang. Malamai/ K/G Mai Anguwa; Dambo IV/ L. E. A. Dambo; Dakace IV/ L. E. A. Dakace
Zaria	Wucicciri	Wucicciri I/ K/G Sarkin Wucicciri; Wucicciri II/ L. E. A. Wucicciri; Wucicciri III/ Gidan Makera; Rubuchi/ L. E. A. Rubuchi; Batas/Dalla/ K/G Salamu Dalla; Tudun Gora/Sabbi/ K/G M. Ang. Tudun Gora; Aba I/ K/G Alh. Na'Idi; Aba II/ L. E. A. Aba; Tudun Iya/Fanga/ K/G M. Ang. Fanga; Kaladi/Damanko/ L. E. A. Kaladi; Zakara/ K/G Mai Anguwa; Bogari I/ L. E. A. Bogori; Bogari II/ L. E. A. Bogori; Ung. Waziri/ Health Centre; Rafin Gamji/ K/G Mai Anguwa; Tudun Kusa/ L. E. A. T/Kusa; Bakin Kogi/ K/G Isa Maikaji; Ung. Fulani/ K/G Mai Anguwa; Rafin Fa/ K/G Mai Anguwa; Ung. Mahauta/ K/G Mai Anguwa; Rubuchi II/ L. E. A. Rubuchi
Zaria	Dutsen Abba	Dutsen Abba/ L. E. A. Dumbi; Yeskwakwe I/ L. E. A. Yeskwakwe; Dorayi/ K/G M. Ang.; Ung. Kako/ L. E. A. Kako; Pam Madina I/ L. E. A. Pam Madina; Pam Madina II/ K/G Sarkin N. Pam Madina; Sayentunkara I/ L. E. A. S. Tunkara; Sayentunkara II/ K/G Sarki S/Tunkara; Layin Kutare Majeru/ N. T. B. B. L. T. Gate; Tankarau/ K/G A. Madada; Ung. Haran/ K/G Mai Ang. Haran; Hange/ L. E. A. Hange; Ung. Malamai I/ K/G M. Ang.; Ung. S. Noma I/ Ung. S. Noma; Ung. Kanawa/ K/G M. Ang.; Kugu/ L. E. A. Kugu; Tudun Gaude/ K/G M. Ang.; Sabon Gida/ K/G Dakace; Dallatu/ K/G M. Ang.; Rafin Yashi Kwabai/ K/G M. Ang.; Babban Abu/ K/G M. Ang.; Kasuwan Dutse/ L. E. A. K/Dutse; Makera/ K/G M. Ang.; Kwaba/ K/G M. Ang.; Maganda/ K/G M. Ang.; Fantan/ K/G M. Ang.; Rafin Gora/ K/G M. Ang.; Kafi Mardanni/ L. E. A. K/Mardanni; Ung. Maliki/ L. E. A. U/Maliki; Sayen Tunkara III/ L. E. A. S/Tunkara; Zura/ Tarayan Sarki
Zaria	Kufena	Kauran Juli/ K. G. Mua'Zu Gamji; Wusasa Kuregu/ L. E. A. Wusasa; Wusasa Asibiti I/ Front S. T. Hospital; Wusasa Asibiti II/ Anna Kitchener; Ung. Dankali I/ L. E. A. Ung. Dankali; Ung. Dankali II/ L. E. A. Ung. Dankali; Gabari I/ L. E. A. Gabari; Gabari II/ Health Clinic; Kufena I/ L. E. A. Kufena; Kufena II/ Kufena College; Bayan Dutse/ K. G. Mai Ung. Karofi; Ung. Magaji/ K. G. Mai Ung. R/Magaji; Dan Magaji/ K. G. Maiwada Goga; Ung. Madaki/ K/G Madaki (Tsoho); Rafin Magaji/ K/G Sule Garba; Tudun Sarki Kubanni/ K/G M. Ung. T/Sarki; Madakin Saye I/ K/G M. Ung. Saye; Kauren Juli II/ K/G M. Mua'Zu Gamji
