= Kafom =

Kafom Kafom Doka Kofom
- Rural
- Location within Nigeria
- Coordinates: 09°49′N 08°15′E
- Country: Nigeria
- State: Kaduna State
- LGA: Zangon Kataf
- District: Kamantan
- Time zone: UTC+01:00 (WAT)
- Area code: 6FXCR4CP+2X
- Climate: Aw

Kafom, also known as Kofom, is a community in Kamantan, Zangon Kataf Local Government Area, southern Kaduna state in the Middle Belt region of Nigeria. Kafom is situated near Lena. The distance from Kafom to the regional capital of Kaduna is approximately 108 km. Distances from Kafom to the largest cities within some part of Southern Kaduna are approximately:

== Nearby localities ==
	Place	Distance
1	Kachia	20.8 km
2	Kafanchan	33.1 km
3	Kagoro	37.5 km
4	Kajuru	73.4 km
5	Lere	77.1 km
6	Saminaka	87.5 km
7	Kujama	88.1 km
8	Zonkwa	17.495 m

== Demographics ==
The village consists primarily of the Bajju people.
