= Kamazo =

Kamazo Kamazau, New Kamazou
- Suburb
- Location within Nigeria
- Coordinates: 10°29′03″N 07°27′41″E
- Country: Nigeria
- State: Kaduna State
- LGA: Chikun
- City: Kaduna

Government
  - Type: Ward
- Time zone: UTC+01:00 (WAT)
- Postal code: 800104
- Climate: Aw

Kamazo (Kamazau) is a suburb located in the Chikun Local Government Area of Kaduna State, specifically within the Southern Kaduna State region in the Middle Belt. Kamazo has a postal code of 800104 which corresponds to the Rido district in Chikun LGA. It is equipped with Kamazo community health centre and also boasts the Ahmed Musa Neighborhood Center. The postal code for the village is 800104. It is equipped with Kamazo community health centre and also boasts the Ahmed Musa Neighborhood Center.

== Economy ==
Kamazo's economy is primarily based on agriculture, similar to other communities in the Chikun Local Government Area. People in the area grow crops like maize, millet, and vegetables. These crops give them food and money. Besides farming, Kamazo has a trade sector, with few bustling markets that serve the local population and attract traders and customers from surrounding areas.

Kamazo and its surrounding communities are served by several local markets that support daily trade and provide access to essential goods and services. These markets cater to residents and visitors alike, offering food items, household products, and locally made crafts.

- Kamazo Market – A community market offering foodstuffs, clothing, household items, and artisanal products. It serves as a primary trading point for residents in the Rido ward.
- Kasuwan Magani Market – Located in Kajuru LGA, this market is known for its grocery stalls and fresh produce. It operates daily and serves nearby communities including parts of Chikun.
- Karji Junction Market – Situated along Patric Yakowa Road in Karji, this open-air market features stalls selling fresh produce, snacks, and everyday goods. It is also known for its street food and evening trade.
- Sabon Tasha Market – A major market located along Kachia Road in Sabon Tasha. It offers grains, vegetables, meat, and prepared foods. The market is a key commercial hub in southern Kaduna.
- Narayi Market – Located in Barnawa district, Narayi Market is known for its fresh produce, groceries, and household items. It operates daily and serves a wide residential catchment area.

== Climate Condition ==
Kamazo is located on Latitude, Longitude, Distance, Bearing of 10° 35' 3" N, 7° 26' 3" E, 11.5km (7.1 miles), 345.0° (NNW) of Nigeria. The community has two major weather conditions which is the raining session and dry seasons.

== Schools ==
Kamazo hosts several primary and secondary schools, some of which are:

1. Ochesy Schools
2. Rhoda Academy
3. Alheri Brains Academy
4. Unique Tediel International Schools
5. Efficient International School
6. Dagama's College Of Health Science And Technology (satellite campus)
7. Ray Academy

== Transport ==
Kamazo is accessible via several major roads, most notably Ibrahim Yakowa Way, which connects the suburb to other parts of southern Kaduna, including Sabon Tasha, Narayi, and Barnawa. The road serves as a key corridor for both private and commercial transport.

Public transportation in Kamazo is primarily provided by:

- Mini-buses (Keke Napep) – Common for short-distance travel within the suburb and nearby communities.
- Motorcycles (Okada) – Widely used for quick access to local markets, schools, and health centers.
- Shared taxis – Operate along major routes, especially toward Kaduna city center and Kachia Road.

The area is served by informal bus stops and junctions such as Kamazo Bustop and Karji Junction, which functions as a local transport hub. While Kamazo does not currently have formal bus terminals or rail access, residents rely on nearby transport infrastructure in Sabon Tasha and Barnawa for intercity travel.

== Notable places ==
Kamazo is home to several public and commercial facilities that serve residents and visitors.

- Kamazo Health Centre provides basic healthcare services and is listed in the Kaduna State health registry.Strategically situated along Ibrahim Yakowa Way, the health centre provides vital healthcare services to residents, contributing to the overall well-being of the community.
- Ahmed Musa Neighborhood Center is a sports and recreation facility established by footballer Ahmed Musa. It includes a gym, football pitch, and event space.
- EdiJen Petrol Station is a fueling and gas refill outlet located along Patrick Yakowa Way in Kamazo. It offers petrol, diesel, and cooking gas services, and includes a mini-mart and auto bay.
- Apple Gate Suites is a hospitality business incorporated in 2023. It is located off Learner's Junction in Maigero, near Kamazo, and offers lodging and short-term accommodation.
- Freedom Hotel is a small hotel and lodge that offers basic accommodation, a bar, and restaurant services.
