= Lere, Nigeria =

Lere Leri, Lera
- LGA and Town
- Interactive map of Lere
- Location within Nigeria
- Coordinates: 10°22′25″N 8°34′33″E
- Country: Nigeria
- State: Kaduna State
- Headquarters: Saminaka

Government
  - Type: Democracy
  - Executive Chairman: Hon. Jafaru Ahmed Saminaka

Area
  - Total: 2,634 km^{2} (1,017 sq mi)

Population (2006)
  - Total: 339,740
  - Density: 174.1/km^{2} (451/sq mi)
- 2006 National Population Census
- Time zone: UTC+1 (WAT)
- Postal code: 811
- ISO 3166 code: NG.KD.LE

Lere is a Local Government Area and town in the southern part of Kaduna State, Nigeria. It is the headquarters of the Lere Emirate. The town and its environs have an estimated population of 93,290 (2016). Lere Local Government Area covers 2,634 square kilometres (1,017 mi^{2}) and had a population of 339,740 at the 2006 census; its headquarters are in the town of Saminaka. The postal code of the area is 811.

== Boundaries ==
Lere Local Government Area (LGA) shares boundaries with Kauru LGA to the west and south, and Kubau LGA to the northwest; Doguwa LGA of Kano State to the north; Toro LGA of Bauchi State to the east; and Bassa LGA of Plateau State to the southeast.

== Administrative subdivisions ==
Lere Local Government Area consists of 11 subdivisions:

- Abadawa
- Dan Alhaji
- Garu Mariri
- Gure Kahugu (Gbiri Niragu)
- Kayarda
- Kudaru
- Lazuru
- Lere
- Raminkura
- Sabon Birni
- Saminaka

== Population ==
Lere Local Government Area's population was recorded as 338,740, based on the March 21, 2006 census records. Its population was projected by the National Population Commission of Nigeria and National Bureau of Statistics to be 458,600 by March 21, 2016.

== Climate ==
Lere has a dry season that is partially cloudy and oppressively overcast, and a hot climate all year round. Lere's climate is classified as a tropical savanna climate. The average annual temperature ranges from 13 to 36 °C (55 to 97 °F), rarely falling below 10 °C (50 °F) or rising over 39 °C (102 °F). The hottest season is from mid February to the end of April. Lere experiences an average of 129 wet days per year, concentrated in a wet season from April to October; the total precipitation is 956 mm (37.6 in) in an average year. From November to February, there is little rain, and temperatures are at their lowest.

== Health care facilities ==
Lere Local Government Area has several public health care facilities, as well as private health care facilities.

== People ==
Lere Local Government Area consists of a number of ethno-linguistic groups and subgroups largely speaking languages belonging to the East Kainji languages group of the Platoid languages such as: Agbiri, Akurmi, Amala, Amap, Anaseni, Aniragu, Arumaruma, Avono, Avori, Azelle, Dungu, Koonu, Kuzamani (Lere), and Tumi. Others include Fulani (in Lere town), Hausa, Igbo, and Zaar.

== Fulani of Lere town ==
=== Origin of the founders of Lere - Fulani Wunti ===
The origin of the founders of Lere goes deep into history and the Takrur region of present-day Mauritania and Senegambia, where a kingdom once thrived under the Fulbe or Fulani. The original founders of Lere claimed as their ancestral home the Futa Toro, where they developed a strong presence around the Senegal river valley as far back as the 5th century. Oral traditions suggest a strong association in terms of intermarriages between them and other ethnic groups such as the North African Berbers like Zenata, Zenaga, and Sanhaja clans, as well as Maqil Arabs which generated several conflicting theories as regards their origin.

Preceding all other claims, however, was a theory that linked the forefathers of the founders of Lere to the Fatimids in North Africa through Idris bin Abdallah, founder of the Idrisid dynasty in Morocco. He traced his ancestry to Ali ibn Abi Talib and his wife Fatimah, daughter of the Prophet Muhammad. Nevertheless, some historical records strongly suggested that they were a proto-Fulani clan of the Torodbe (Toronkawa) stock. This clan intermarried with the Sanhaja Arabs from Massufa in the Western Sahara, who founded the Almoravid or al-Murabitun movement in the eleventh century. From the Takrur, they migrated into Western Sudan settling in places like Kunta and Timbuktu. In Timbuktu, they played a significant role in the emergence of Askia Muhammad as emperor of Songhai at the fall of the Mali Empire in the 15th century.

After Askia Muhammad defeated Sonni Barou at the Battle of Anfao in April 1493, which ended the reign of the Za dynasty in Songhai, he re-organised the Songhai Empire and appointed Umar bin Muhammad Naddi, a Sanhaja Arab, as governor of Timbuktu, and the Askia gave him the right to possess a drum as a sign of his authority. Later the title of Timbuktu-koi or governor of Timbuktu was taken over by the famous Aqit family, a Torodbe-Sanhaja. The family produced several Qadis or governors until Umar bin Mahmud Aqit, who lost to the Moroccan Sa'dis following the fall of the Songhai Empire in 1591, after the Moroccan invasion.

The Aqit family were said to have been dispersed by the Moroccans who spread violence, cruelty and destruction upon the cities of Timbuktu, Jenne, and Gao. Some members of the Aqit family together with their Torodbe cousins left Timbuktu at the fall of the empire. They moved across the Niger Bend into Niger and Burkina Faso in the early 17th century, establishing several towns and settlements amongst whom are two separate towns sharing a similar name of "Lere", southwest of Timbuktu and at the Dendi region of present-day Burkina Faso. In their possession were three drums (Tambura) brought from the ruins of their palaces in Timbuktu. These drums (Tambura) were part of the insignia of office for the governors of Timbuktu province in Songhai Empire. From Niger, they drifted southward into present-day northern Nigeria and settled at Zamfara, near Maru in a place now known as Tsohon Banaga. This Fulani clan was later identified as Fulanin Dawaki, because they were excellent horse-breeders. But they split into several sub-groups, mainly due to their huge population and many cattle, camels, goats and horses.

Mallam Muhammad Dadi established himself in Maru and when Shehu Usman Dan Fodio flagged off the Jihad in 1804, he assisted the Shehu and defeated the Banaga Dan Bature of Morai. His son, Umaru, was made the Banaga by Caliph Muhammad Bello and he went and established the present Maru town in 1810. But Muhammad Dadi's other brothers, Muhammad Sambo, Muhammad Dabo (Titi), Yunusa and few others travelled southward to Zaria.

Muhammad Sambo left his two younger brothers in Zaria and moved to Kachia along with a very large contingent. Some of his offspring remained in sparse camps in the Kangimi area and later Kawo and Tudun Wada in what would become the Kaduna metropolis. Muhammad Dabo (Titi) left his brother, Yunusa, in Jaji near Zaria and travelled to south-eastern Zazzau, near present-day Dan Alhaji, where he built his camp.

Muhammadu Dabo was nicknamed 'Titi', a shortened Fulbe word for 'Titiye' meaning 'the nomad.' While he was there, a group under Usman Biri, apparently tired of roaming, broke from the camp and travelled to the southern part of Bauchi territory. They fought, defeated and subjugated the Sayawa near present-day Tafawa Balewa, and built a walled town, naming it Leren-Zagezagi in the 1790s.

The word 'Lere' could be translated to be the Fulbe phrase of 'a permanent place' or 'station'. But according to Lere chroniclers, the name was derived from a daughter of Muhammad Dabo (Titi) who was married to Usman Biri. Nonetheless, the people of Leren-Zagezagi paid allegiance to the Habe ruler of Zazzau and it remained so until after the 1804 jihad in Bauchi, when Mallam Yakubu, the first Emir of Bauchi, fought and annexed the territory in 1810 and forced them to pay allegiance to Bauchi instead of Zazzau, which marked its renaming to Leren Bauchi. It is however instructive to note that in 1808 Muhammadu Dabo Titi picked Lere as the name for his newly established vassal state after his installation in Sokoto.

=== Traditional institution ===
The Emirate of Lere was established in 1808 by a branch of Toronkawa Fulani, known as the Fulanin Wunti-Gyamzo, under the leadership of Malam Muhammadu Dabo Titi. This Fulani group arrived at the Bauchi territory in the late 18th century after moving from Maru in Zamfara. The leader of this Fulani clan settled in the precinct of Zaranda during the pre-jihad period.

Having settled at Zaranda for a while, Malam Muhammadu Dabo Titi shifted base to Toro and built his home at a place called Gyamzo. Thus, that was how the group under Muhammadu Dabo Titi got its name Wunti-Gyamzo.

At the commencement of the jihad spearheaded by Shehu Usman Dan Fodio in 1804, Malam Muhammadu Dabo Titi assisted Mallam Yakubu, the flag bearer of the jihad in Bauchi, which resulted in the establishment of Bauchi Emirate in 1805. Malam Muhammadu Dabo Titi was offered the title of Sarkin Yaki by Malam Yakubu, the first emir of Bauchi, but he relinquished the title to his in-law, Muhammadu Kusu, a Filata Borno. Muhammadu Kusu's descendants and those of Muhammadu Dabo Titi hold the title of Sarkin Yaki (King Maker) and also District Head of Lame successively, in the present Bauchi Emirate to date.

Shortly after, a major disagreement ensued between Malam Muhammadu Dabo Titi and the Emir of Bauchi Mallam Yakubu over the imposition of cattle taxes on Fulanin Wunti. The case was referred to Shehu Usman Dan Fodio, who after careful study ordered for the return of the cattle to Titi.

Sequel to this a request was again made by Malam Muhammadu Dabo Titi to Shehu Usman Dan Fodio for the transfer of allegiance to Zazzau from Bauchi.

Malam Musa Bamalli, the first emir of Zazzau, was a personal friend and teacher to Dabo Titi and his brother Malam Sambo. The Shehu, however, suggested that Dabo Titi relocate to Bukuru, near present-day Jos, Plateau State, where he would be made a flag bearer. But Dabo Titi chose to stay under Malam Musa and remain in his Toro country home. The Shehu granted Dabo Titi's request for transfer of allegiance and advised firmly that Dabo Titi should accept a vassalage status in Zazzau emirate. The Shehu carved out parts of Bauchi and Zazzau emirates and incorporated them into the new Lere vassal state, marking the creation of Lere in 1808.

From the onset, Lere's territory as engraved by the Shehu covered a vast area within the present Bauchi and Plateau states. To the east, it stretched up to a place called Inkel. Also it extended to River Dilimi and Farar Gada in Jos to the south, while to the north it stretched to Riruwai in Kano state. The western boundary was the Lere river, widely known as River Karami.

The Shehu allowed Dabo Titi to remain in Toro, which did not go down well with Malam Yakubu and so he asked Dabo Titi to move out of the area. When he refused, Yakubu marched his forces to Ribina, west of Toro, and made it part of his territory. Ribina was earlier under the rulership of Dabo Titi.

Dabo Titi reported the matter to Malam Musa, the emir of Zazzau, and sought his permission to fight Malam Yakubu so as to reclaim his territory, but Malam Musa urged him to move southwest of Toro and avoid armed conflict, which the Shehu had forbidden among his followers. Dabo Titi moved his headquarters to a place called Kunka, then, inhabited by a tribe called Limoro and consolidated his country and subjects as vassal of Zazzau.

Dabo Titi and his people found it difficult to settle in one place because of their large number. They broke up into smaller settlements within the territory they controlled and occupied. Subsequently, the headquarters of Lere vassal state was moved to several places up to the time it was established in its present site in 1870 by Sarkin Lere Muhammadu Dankaka (1857–1907). Sarkin Lere Idris Murabus (1830–1847) founded his base near the rock of Gurba (near Sheni), while his brother Sarkin Lere Mamman (Muhammadu), who ruled from 1850 to 1856, chose a place called Liyanga, which is near present-day Domawa, as his headquarters. Upon his ascension to the throne in 1857, Malam Muhammadu Dankaka founded Masherengi as a unified settlement but was forced to abandon it following a night raid by Sarkin Ningi Dan Maje in 1867 which destroyed the town.

To pacify Malam Yakubu following several agitations, Lafia, which was earlier a vassal of Zazzau, was ceded to Bauchi by the Sokoto Caliphate as its vassal in return for Lere in 1812. This exchange resulted in Zazzau emirate having ten vassal states namely Lere, Keffi, Nasarawa, Doma, Jema'a, Lapai, Kajuru, Kauru, Fatika and Durum. The ten vassal states operated independent hereditary leadership succession within their existing ruling houses. Among all these vassal states, however, only Lere has been given the mandate to keep up to a dozen royal drums (Tambura), which indicated the pre-eminence of Lere above the other components. As stated earlier Lere vassal was ruled by the following chiefs:

1. Malam Muhammadu Dabo Titi (1808–1830)
2. Malam Idris Murabus (1830–1847)
3. Malam Aliyu I (1847–1850)
4. Malam Mamman (1850–1856)
5. Malam Muhammadu Dankaka (1857–1905)

Sequel to the colonial takeover of the Northern Emirates in 1903, the vassalage system was abolished and replaced by districts and provinces. In the course of this re-organisation, substantial parts of Lere Vassal State were merged with Bauchi and Plateau provinces. The remnants which constitute the present Lere Local Government Area was thus reduced to a district status under a hereditary rulership system (or Sarki) in 1905 during the reign of Muhammadu Dankaka. Consequent to the reduction of Lere vassal to a district status, the following district heads ruled the district.

1. Malam Muhammadu Dankaka (1905–1907)
2. Malam Abdullahi (1907–1912)
3. Malam Abubakar (1912–1915)
4. Malam Abdullahi (1915–1918)
5. Barden Lere Abdulkarim (Regent) (1918–1920)

In the period of 1907 to 1918, during the reign of Emir of Zazzau Aliyu Dan Sidi, Sarkin Lere Abdullahi and Sarkin Lere Abubakar were alleged to have misappropriated tax and were deposed. Both Sarkin Lere Abdullahi and Sarkin Lere Abubakar were neither given the full status of District Head and were not paid any salary throughout the period of their reign. However, Sarkin Ruwan Zazau Salau, Dan Galadiman Zazzau Abbas and his brother Walin Zazzau Halliru were moderators until 1920. After the removal of Abdullahi for the second time, no chief was appointed for Lere for two years. However, in 1920 Walin Zazzau Halliru was gazetted as District Head of Lere for the period of 1920 to 1924. Since then Lere had the following District Heads posted from Zaria.

1. Walin Zazzau Umaru (1925–1946)
2. Dallatun Zazau Muhammadu (1946–1951)
3. Walin Zazzau Umaru (1951–1968)
4. Makaman Zazzau Karami, Alhaji Halliru (1968–1986)

It was also in 1920 that Sarkin Lere Aliyu Mai'Itu was appointed Village Head of Lere. Thus, the following people ruled Lere with a reduced status of village head.

1. Malam Aliyu Mai'Itu (1920–1924)
2. Malam Musa Ladan (1924–1927)
3. Malam Muhammadu Mijinyawa (1927–1942)
4. Alhaji Muhammadu Sani (1942–1980)
5. Alhaji Umaru Muhammad (1980–1986)

=== Return of district headship to original heirs ===
However, a turning point in the transformation of Lere Chiefdom was made in 1986 when the late Sarkin Lere, Alhaji Umaru Muhammad, then Village Head of Lere, was appointed as District Head of Lere. He succeeded the late Makaman Zazzau Alhaji Halliru who died in the same year.

=== Restoration of traditional institution ===
The upgrading of Lere traditional institution from the status of a district to a third class chiefdom came with the 12th Sarkin Lere Alhaji Umaru Mohammed receiving the staff of office on January 21, 2001, which marked another historical milestone. This is a precedent for the full restoration of Lere's traditional status and a step towards attaining the position of Emirate as its peers in Kaduna and other states. Yet again, following the process of re-grading some traditional institutions, the Kaduna State Government under the administration of Alhaji Ahmed Mohammed Makarfi upgraded the Lere traditional stool from Third Class to Second Class status on March 9, 2007. Upon the demise of Sarkin Lere Umaru Mohammed on January 23, 2011, his younger brother, Brigadier General Abubakar Garba Mohammed, a former military governor of Sokoto State, was installed as the 13th Emir of Lere.

== Notable people ==
- Mozes Adams, footballer
- Mohammed Dabo Lere, politician
- Saudatu Sani, former member, Nigerian House of Representatives

== See also ==
- List of villages in Kaduna State

== Sources ==
- A History of Islam in West Africa by J. Spencer Trimingham (1962)
- The Emirate of Northern Nigeria by S.J. Hogben and A.H.M. Kirk-Green (1966)
- An Introduction to the History of Islamic States of Northern Nigeria by S.J. Hogben (1967)
- Local Government in the Northern States of Nigeria; Past and Present by Nuhu Bayero
- Government in Zazzau by M.G. Smith among others
