= Karji, Kaduna =

Karji Karji Junction
- Suburb
- Location within Nigeria
- Coordinates: 10°29′28″N 07°28′07″E
- Country: Nigeria
- State: Kaduna State
- LGA: Chikun
- City: Kaduna

Government
  - Type: Ward
- Time zone: UTC+01:00 (WAT)
- 6-digit numeral: 800104
- Climate: Aw

Karji (Karji Junction) is a suburb in the Chikun Local Government Area in Southern Kaduna part of Kaduna State, Middle Belt, Nigeria. Its postal code 800104 and falls under Rido district of the Local Government Area.

== Economy ==
=== Industry ===
Karji supports small-scale industries in the production of functional item needed by the people around such as;

1. Local artisans producing traditional crafts such as textiles, pottery and wood work.
2. Food and beverages for local delicacies including suya and puff-puff in the area.
3. Social and Night activities such as clubbing during weekends are popular in the axis. one popular club among those is AGS (Apple Gate Suites) Club.

=== Market and Shopping ===
- Karji Junction

Which features shops and mini markets with diverse goods and services, attracting people from various suburbs and locations. Other markets which have closed proximity with Kàrji Market are Sabon Tasha Market, Kamazo Market and Narayi Market.

- Goods and Services

The market also offers a range of products and services, including food, household equipment, traditional crafts, car wash, and dry cleaning services.

- Businesses

Various businesses operate in the area, catering to the needs of residents and travelers.

== Demographic ==
- Population

The area is popular among students and working-class individuals due to its affordability and accessibility.

- Residents

Many students from Kaduna State University and other institutions reside in the area as well as those owning properties in the area.

== Temperature ==
In Karji, temperatures are presently between 87-92°F (31-33°C) and are forecast to fall to around 60-63°F (16-17°C) by night. The weather clear with gentle winds, and the likelihood of rainfall remains low.

== Transport ==
Karji Junction offers several transportation option for commuters like,

- Public Bus

Karji is a major bus stop with public buses passing in both directions, connecting to the center of Kaduna and Kamazo.

- Motorcycle (Okada)

Motorcycle riders are readily available to convey people to their destinations.

- Walking

Walkable routes allow individuals to connect to Karji Junction on foot.

== Schools ==
Below are some primary and secondary schools located in Karji, Kaduna

=== Primary Schools ===
- Cindys Nursery Primary And Secondary School Kaduna
- Patmon Model Nursery and Primary School
- Pristine Kiddies Palace School

=== Secondary Schools ===
- Classic Dove Schools (Secondary)
- The Einstein School
- Rosejen International School
- Brains Foundation Academy (Secondary)
- Usrija International School
- Evat Model Schools
- Kad Academy

== Notable Places ==
=== Parks and Gardens ===
- La Rumba Garden for relaxation and entertainment.
- Rowin Garden for leisure from the city's hustle and bustle.
- Red Onions Garden for leisure and socializing.
- Apple Gate Suites for clubbing/Lodging and bar activities.
- Bridge Park and Events for events and gatherings.

=== Landmarks ===
- Karji junction is a well-known landmark, connecting people to various parts of Kaduna.
- Rock Garden, a spot with beautiful rock formations.
- Water Intake Riverside, a scenic spot with a picturesque view.
- Ahmed Musa Neighborhood Center, a place for fitness, relaxation and sport lovers.
- Kaduna State University, a nearby institution that makes Karji Junction a convenient shopping destination for students and staff.
