= Sabon Tasha =

Suburb of Chikun Local Government Area

Sabon Tasha is a suburb of Chikun Local Government Area of Kaduna State, Nigeria. Situated within the Kaduna metropolitan area of Southern Kaduna, Middle Belt, Nigeria. The postal code for this area is 800246. Sabon Tasha is primarily a residential ward in Chikun Local Government, situated South of the Kaduna River.

== Localities ==
Sabon Tasha includes lots of residentials and estates

- Sabo Government Reserve Area (GRA).
- Ungwan Pama
- Ungwan Boro
- Ungwan Bulus.

== Education ==
Sabon Tasha is a host to several public and private schools, which includes;

- Christ Ambassadors College.
- Government Secondary School, Sabon Tasha.
- Our Lady's of Fatima Girls Secondary School, Sabon Tasha.

== Geography ==
Sabon Tasha is situated at an elevation of approximately 621 meters above sea level. It shares boundaries with Narayi, Barnawa, and Television (Kaduna South) within the Kaduna Metropolis.
