= Lazuru =

Lazuru Lazuru Tuddai
- Village
- Location within Nigeria
- Coordinates: 10°16′38″N 08°43′11″E
- Country: Nigeria
- State: Kaduna State
- LGA: Lere
- Time zone: UTC+01:00 (WAT)
- Climate: Aw

Lazuru is a village community in Lere Local Government Area, southern Kaduna state in the Middle Belt region of Nigeria. The postal code for the village is 811104.

The area has an altitude of about 789 meters.

== History ==
Lazuru is said to be the location previously settled by the Agbiri people, who were also said to have moved westwards to where they presently live, around the plains of the Gure Hills. The period in which this movement occurred is unknown.

== See also ==
- List of villages in Kaduna State
