= Loungin' =

Loungin' may refer to:

- "Loungin'", a song from Guru's Jazzmatazz, Vol. 1
- "Loungin", a song by LL Cool J
- "Loungin'", a song by Aim from his album FabricLive.17

== See also ==
- Lounge (disambiguation)
