= Rido ward =

Rido Maraban Rido
- Suburb
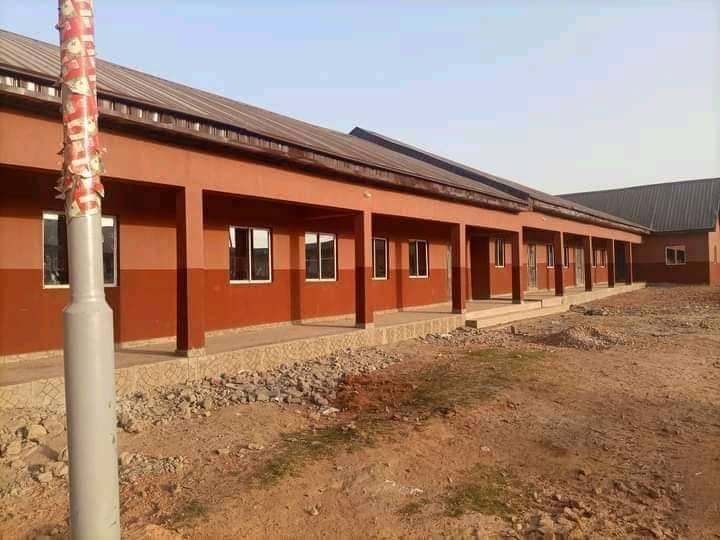

- Location within Nigeria
- Coordinates: 10°23′N 07°29′E
- Country: Nigeria
- State: Kaduna State
- LGA: Chikun
- City: Kaduna

Government
  - Type: Ward
- Time zone: UTC+01:00 (WAT)
- Postal code: 800104
- Climate: Aw

Rido (Maraban Rido) is a ward and a suburb community in Chikun Local Government Area, in the City of Kaduna State in the Middle Belt region of Nigeria. The postal code of the area is 800104.

Rido is designated as Ward 9, which is one of 12 wards in the Chikun Local Government Area.

== Geography ==
The ward contains numerous polling units, which indicate its internal subdivisions. These include Ungwan Maigero, Kudansa, Mahuta, Maraban Rido, and Kamazau. Rido is an active polling area during elections.

== Security ==
As was In July 2021, over 100 pupils were kidnapped from a secondary school in the Chikun LGA, of which Rido is a part. Here come recently in October 2025, Rido Ward, continues to face persistent security challenges, primarily from the banditry, kidnapping, and street crime. While the state government and security agencies report some successes against criminal elements, widespread voter apathy during August 2025 by-elections highlighted that many residents remain fearful due to ongoing incidents.

== Demographics ==
The indigenous people of the wider Chikun LGA are the Gbagyi, though urbanization has made it a more cosmopolitan area.
