= Vori language =

Kainji language of Nigeria

Vori
- Surubu
- TiVori
- Native to: Nigeria
- Region: Kaduna State
- Native speakers: 3,000 (2016)
- Language family: Niger–Congo?: Atlantic–Congo; Benue–Congo; Kainji; East Kainji; Vori

Language codes
- ISO 639-3: sde
- Glottolog: suru1258
- ELP: Kaivi

Vori
- Person: PiVori
- People: AVori
- Language: TiVori

Vori (also called Surubu or Skrubu) is a Kainji language of Nigeria.

Roger Blench (2016) reported that the people referred to as Surubu in the present literature are called Vori. Their main centre is the town of Geshere, which is west of Mariri on the Lere road. The Vori live in 32 settlements, and there are about 50,000 to 70,000 speakers.

Bina, another undocumented language, is spoken nearby.
