= Ahmed Musa =

Nigerian footballer (born 1992)

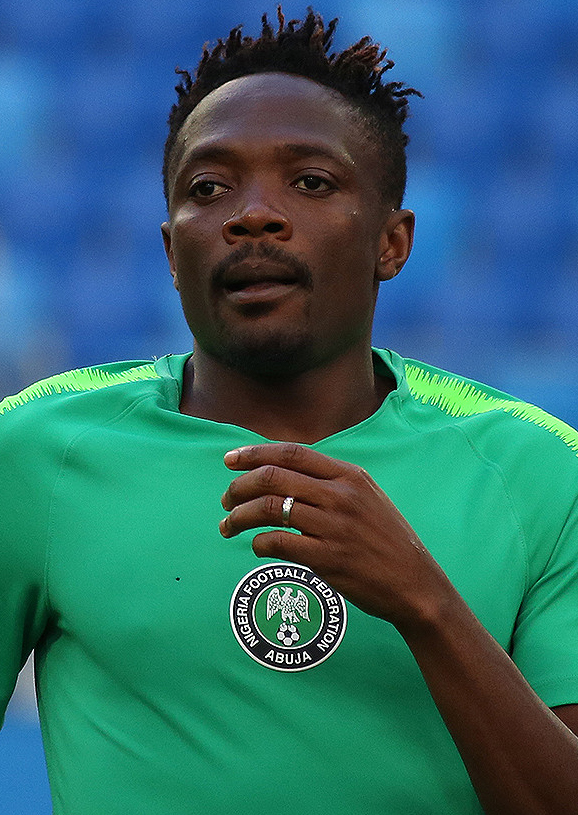
- Musa training with Nigeria at the 2018 FIFA World Cup

Personal information
- Full name: Ahmed Musa
- Date of birth: 14 October 1992 (age 34)
- Place of birth: Jos, Plateau, Nigeria
- Height: 1.71 m (5 ft 7 in)
- Position: Winger

Team information
- Current team: Kano Pillars
- Number: 7

Youth career
- 2005–2008: GBS Academy

Senior career*
Years	Team	Apps	(Gls)
2008–2010	GBS Academy	0	(0)
2008–2009	→ JUTH (loan)	18	(4)
2009–2010	→ Kano Pillars (loan)	25	(18)
2010–2012	VVV-Venlo	37	(8)
2012–2016	CSKA Moscow	125	(42)
2016–2018	Leicester City	21	(2)
2018	→ CSKA Moscow (loan)	10	(6)
2018–2020	Al-Nassr	50	(9)
2021	Kano Pillars	8	(0)
2021–2022	Fatih Karagümrük	34	(2)
2022–2024	Sivasspor	19	(0)
2024–	Kano Pillars	55	(16)

International career^{‡}
2011	Nigeria U20	6	(3)
2011	Nigeria U23	1	(1)
2010–2025	Nigeria	110	(16)
Medal record
Representing Nigeria
Africa Cup of Nations
Winner	2013 South Africa
Runner-up	2023 Ivory Coast
- * Club domestic league appearances and goals as of 01 November 2026 ‡ National team caps and goals as of 21:00, 28 May 2025 (UTC)

Ahmed Musa OON MON (/ˈɑːxmɛd muːsə/; born 14 October 1992) is a Nigerian professional footballer who plays as a forward or winger for Nigeria Premier Football League club Kano Pillars.

Musa became the first Nigerian to score more than once in a FIFA World Cup match, after scoring twice against Argentina in the 2014 FIFA World Cup. Musa is also the first Nigerian to score in two FIFA World Cup competitions, after scoring another brace against Iceland in the group stage of the 2018 FIFA World Cup. With 110 appearances, he is Nigeria's most capped player since November 2021. Musa was a member of the Saudi club Al Nassr's squad that won the Saudi Premier League and Saudi Super Cup, both in 2019.

== Club career ==
Musa began his career in the GBS Football Academy.

=== Breakthrough in Nigeria ===
In 2008, Musa was loaned to JUTH F.C. where he played 18 games, scoring four goals in his first two professional seasons for the Healers. He was subsequently loaned to Kano Pillars F.C., in the 2009–10 season where he set the league record scoring multiple crucial goals as Pillars finished second.

Musa held the record for the highest goals ever scored in one season in the history of the Nigeria Premier League with 18 goals until November 2011, when Jude Aneke of Kaduna United F.C. set a new record of 20 goals.

=== VVV-Venlo ===
Musa was transferred to Dutch club VVV-Venlo in summer 2010, but the move was held up because he was only 17 years of age and therefore not eligible for an ITC in accordance with the current FIFA rules. He was officially eligible to play for VVV-Venlo on 14 October 2010 when he eventually turned 18 years of age.

Less than a week after arriving at the club, Musa made his debut for VVV-Venlo against FC Groningen on 30 October. He started the game for VVV-Venlo, was fouled in the 50th minute and received a penalty kick.

Rated by Goal.com amongst the Hot 100 young football stars in the world to watch in 2011, Lolade Adewuyi of Goal.com put him on the list of Top Ten Nigerian International Players of 2010 and was also included in IFFHS list of the best 140 players in the world.

On 8 March 2011, Ahmed Musa won the AIT footballer of the year award (national). The ceremony was held at the Presidential Hotel, Port Harcourt, Rivers State. The event had in attendance, BBC African Footballer of the Year winner, Ghanaian Asamoah Gyan and the top officials from the Nigerian football federation including the president Aminu Maigari.

In April, Venlo's football director Mario Captien said that representatives of Tottenham Hotspur had visited the club regarding the player, also Ajax scout Tijani Babangida said that Ajax were interested in Musa but that the outcome would be decided at the end of the season.

On 1 May 2011, Musa hit a brace to sink Feyenoord 3–2 and end any lingering fears of automatic relegation from the Eredivisie.

In August 2011, after returning from the 2011 FIFA U-20 World Cup in Colombia, Musa made his first appearance of the 2011–12 season at home against AFC Ajax and scored two goals.

In September VVV-Venlo chairman Hai Berden disclosed on Eredivisie Live that VVV-Venlo had turned down a last minute bid of €10 million for Musa from the Bundesliga. The name of the Bundesliga club was not disclosed.

=== CSKA Moscow ===
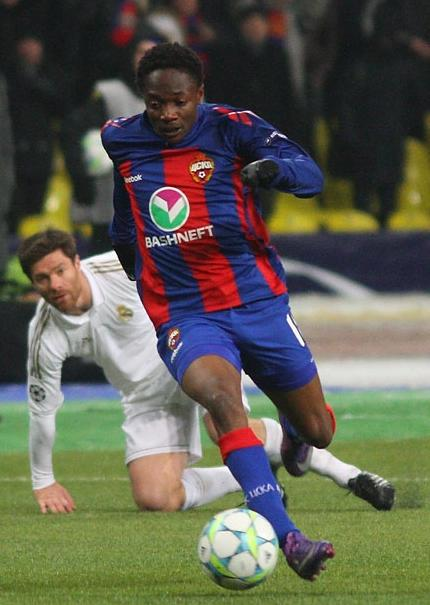
Musa playing for CSKA Moscow in 2012

On 7 January 2012, Musa signed for Russian side CSKA Moscow for an undisclosed fee.

On 17 September 2014 he scored an 82nd minute consolation goal in a 5–1 UEFA Champions League away rout to A.S. Roma. On 1 June 2015, Musa signed a new four-year contract with CSKA until the end of the 2018–19 season. He finished the 2015–16 Russian Premier League season as the 5th highest scorer, becoming one of only seven players aged 23 or younger to reach double figures for goals in each of the past two seasons in Europe's top seven leagues.

=== Leicester City ===
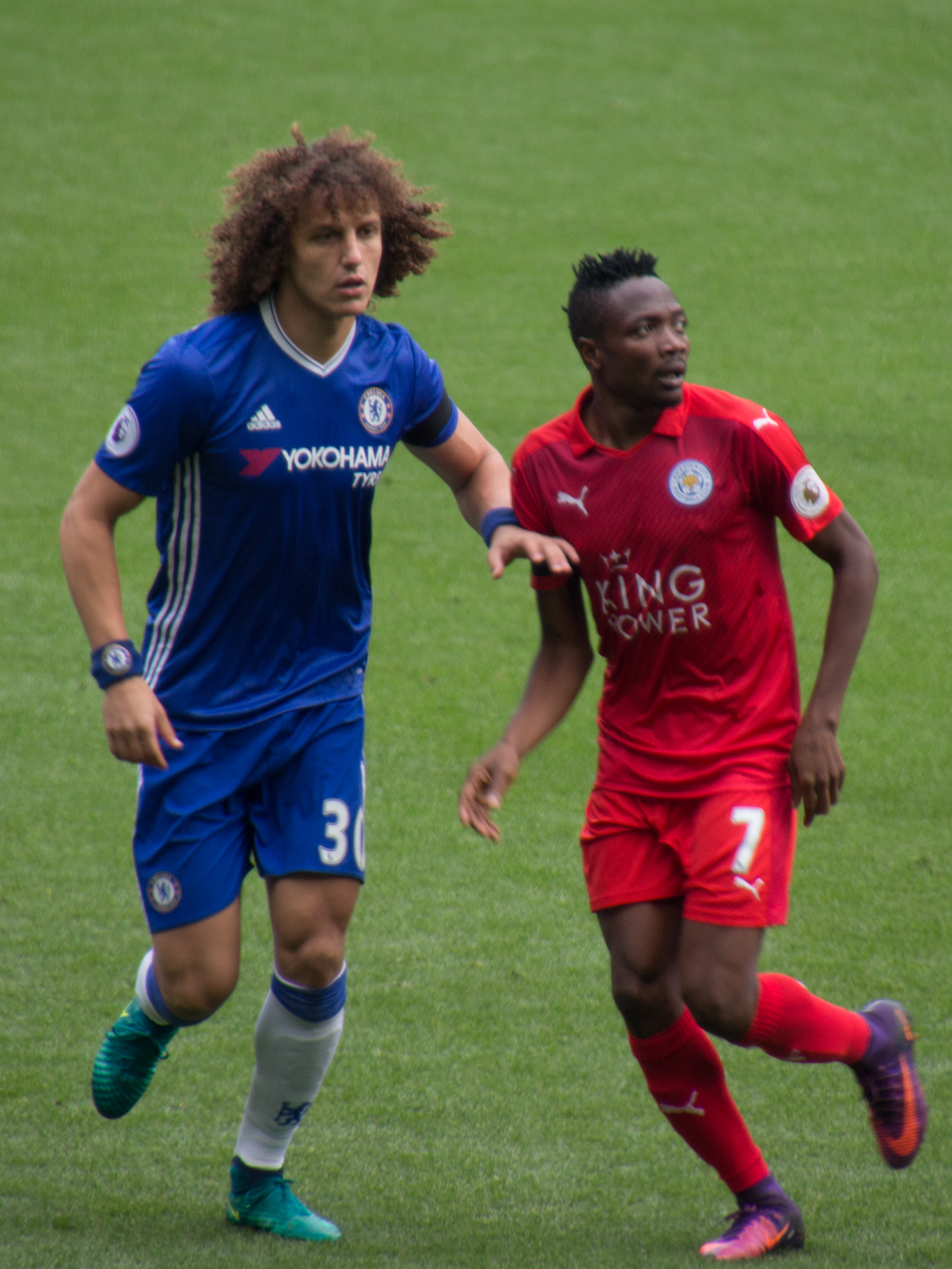
Musa (right) playing for Leicester City in a league match against Chelsea at Stamford Bridge on 15 October 2016

On 8 July 2016, Musa moved to Leicester City for a club record £16.6 million. He scored his first goals with the club in a friendly against Barcelona in the 2016 International Champions Cup which ended in a 4–2 loss. He made his Premier League debut on 13 August 2016 in the club's opening day 2–1 defeat to Hull City. He scored his first Premier League goal with the opener in a 3–1 victory over Crystal Palace on 22 October 2016.

By January 2017, Musa was yet to register an assist for the club, contributing an average of 0.5 key passes, 0.3 crosses and 1.2 successful dribbles per game.

==== Loan return to CSKA Moscow ====
On 30 January 2018, Musa returned to CSKA Moscow on loan for the remainder of the 2017–18 season.

=== Al Nassr ===
On 4 August 2018, Musa moved to Saudi Arabian side Al Nassr on a permanent deal. In October 2020, Al Nassr announced that Musa was leaving. It was reported that Premier League club West Bromwich Albion were expected to complete a move for Musa in the January transfer window for the 2020–21 season, but the move fell through.

=== Return to Kano Pillars ===
On 13 April 2021, Musa rejoined Nigerian club Kano Pillars until the end of the 2020–21 season.

=== Turkey ===
==== Fatih Karagümrük ====
On 23 July 2021, Musa joined Turkish club Fatih Karagümrük, signing a two-year contract. After one season, Musa terminated his contract on a mutual agreement.

==== Sivasspor ====
On 2 September 2022, Musa signed on a free transfer for Turkish club Sivasspor on a two-year deal. His contract was terminated on mutual agreement.

=== Third spell at Kano Pillars ===
In October 2024, Musa returned to Kano Pillars for a third stint.

== International career ==
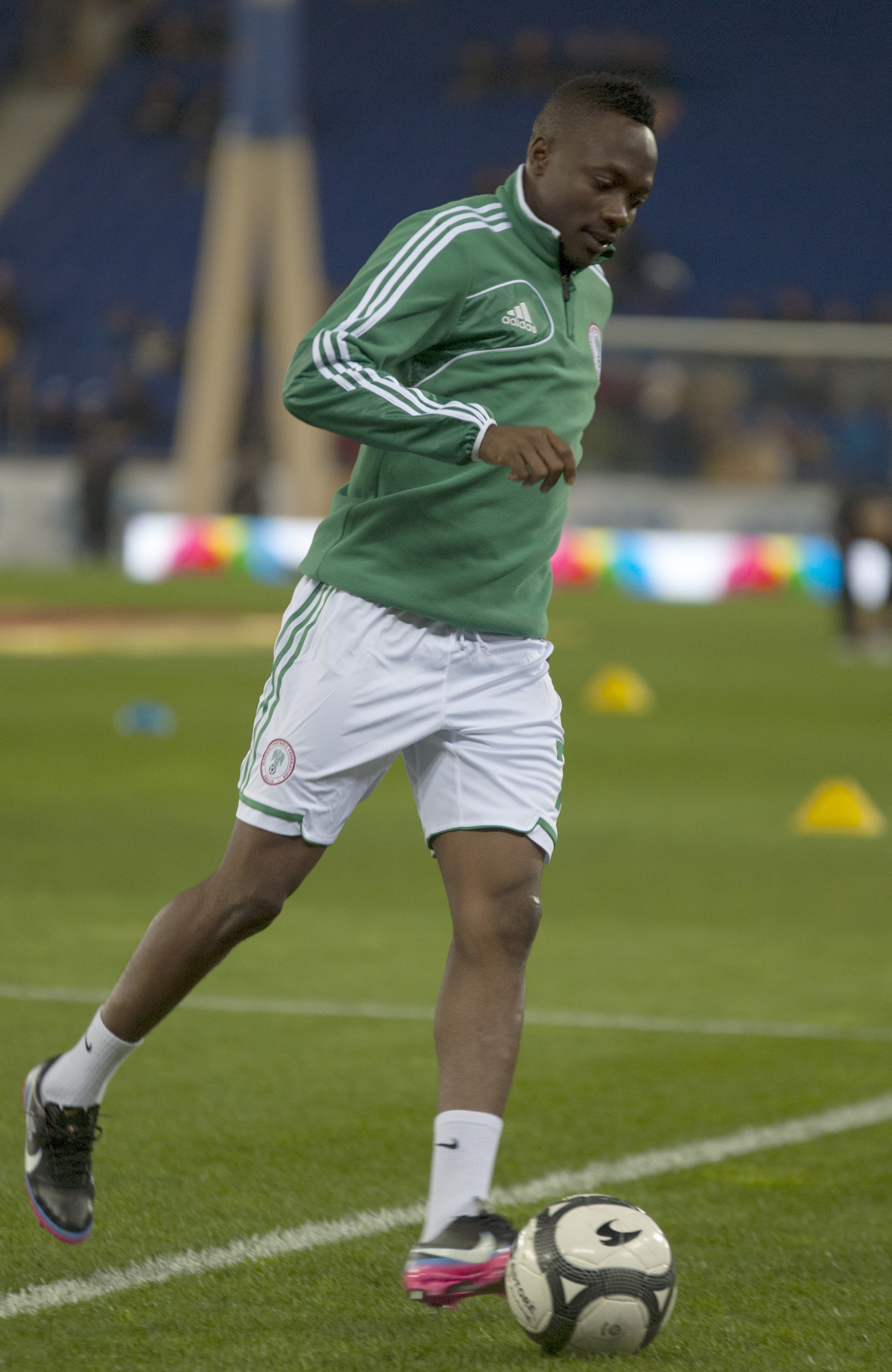
Musa with Nigeria in 2013

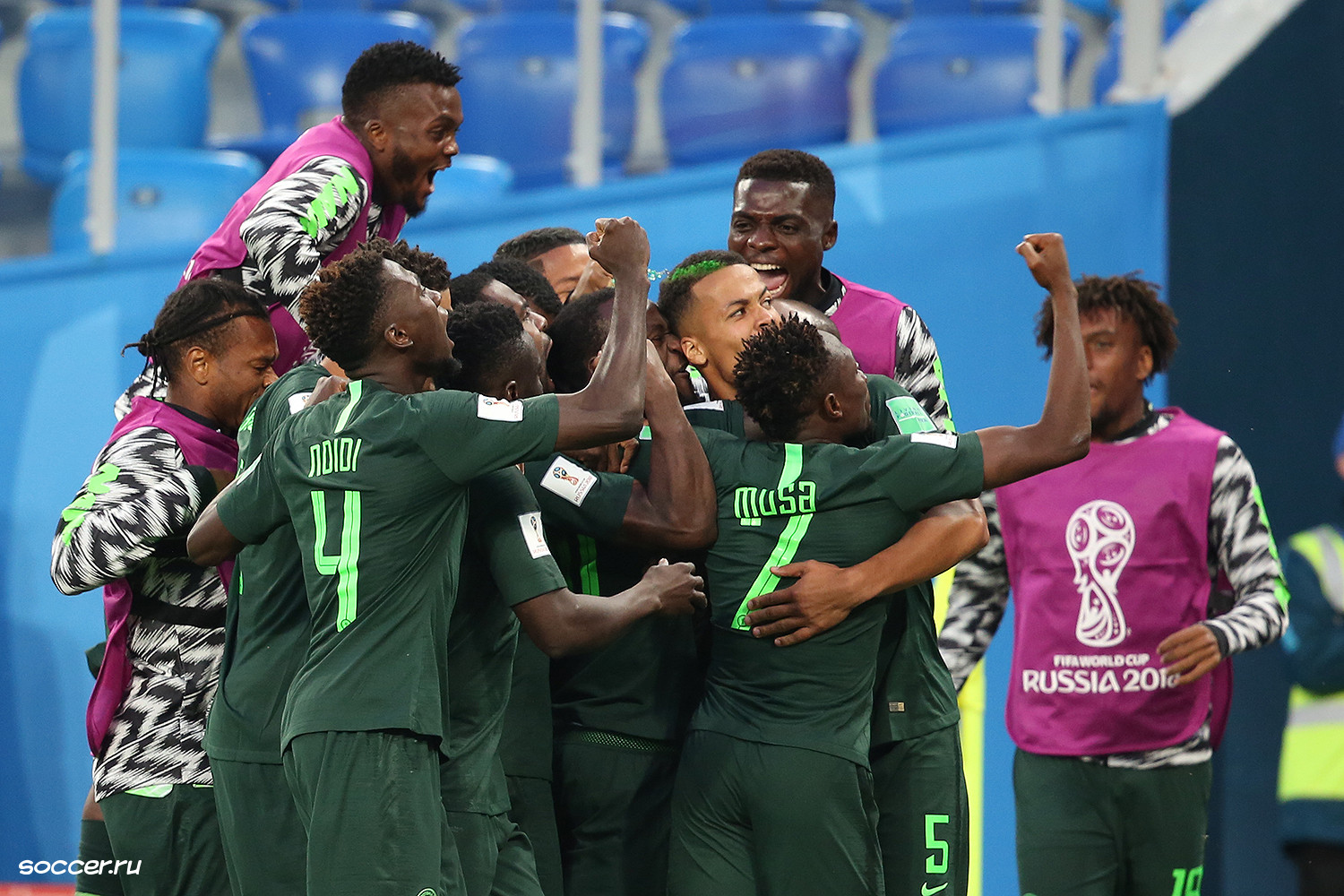
Musa with Nigeria against Argentina at the 2018 FIFA World Cup

In April 2010 under Coach Lars Lagerbäck, he was called up to join the Nigeria national football team camp prior to the 2010 FIFA World Cup in South Africa after helping the Nigerian team win in the 2010 WAFU Nations Cup where he scored a goal against Benin. In the same tournament against Burkina Faso, Musa's goal deep into extra-time shot Nigeria into the finals of the tournament in Abeokuta. He was however forced out of the Super Eagles' 30-man World Cup roster due to an ankle injury.

On 5 September 2010, at the age of 17, Musa made his debut for the Nigeria senior team in a qualification match for the 2012 Africa Cup of Nations against Madagascar, where he came on as a substitute for Mikel John Obi in a 2–0 win. Musa scored his first goal for the Super Eagles in a March 2011 friendly against Kenya.

In April 2011, Musa was included in the Nigeria national under-20 football team squad to represent the nation in the 2011 African Youth Championship qualifiers, even though VVV Venlo had declared him unavailable for the tournament due to club commitments. After some intense negotiations with the Nigerian Federation, VVV Venlo and Musa's representatives it was agreed that Musa will shuttle between the Netherlands and South Africa to participate in the tournament with the national team. After the opening game against defending champions Ghana, Musa won the most valuable player award and boarded the next flight back to the Netherlands.

In August 2011, Musa represented Nigeria U20 in the 2011 FIFA U-20 World Cup held in Colombia, where he scored three goals in five matches. Musa was included by FIFA in shortlist of 10 candidates for the Adidas Golden Ball, which was awarded to the most outstanding player of the FIFA U-20 World Cup.

On 7 December 2011, Ahmed Musa was one of the four nominees named for the Confederation of African Football Most Promising Talent Award, however the award went to Ivory Coast's Souleymane Coulibaly.

Musa was called up to Nigeria's 23-man squad for the 2013 Africa Cup of Nations. He scored in a 4–1 semi-final defeat of Mali and appeared as a substitute against Burkina Faso in the final, as the Super Eagles won their third continental title. Overall, he appeared in five of the team's six matches. At the 2013 FIFA Confederations Cup, he started in all three of the team's matches as they were eliminated in the group stage.

After appearing in all of Nigeria's qualifying matches, Musa was named in Stephen Keshi's squad for the 2014 FIFA World Cup. He scored two goals in the team's final Group F match, a 3–2 defeat to Argentina.

In October 2015, following the retirement of Vincent Enyeama from international football, Nigerian coach, Sunday Oliseh named Musa as the captain of the team. This decision was however reversed in 2016 as Mikel John Obi was named captain of the Nigerian squad and Musa was moved to Vice Captain.

In May 2018, he was named in Nigeria's preliminary 30-man squad for the 2018 FIFA World Cup in Russia. Though his performance against Iceland was superb, it was not enough to keep the West Africans in the tournament as they were eliminated by Argentina. On 22 June 2018, Musa scored twice in a 2–0 victory over Iceland in their second group match of the World Cup. In June 2019 he became the third most capped player for Nigeria's national team, surpassing Nwankwo Kanu, after appearing in a friendly against Zimbabwe. He was named in the 2019 Africa Cup of Nations team by head coach Gernot Rohr. He was also part of the Nigerian squad at the 2021 and 2023 editions of the African Cup of Nations (AFCON) held in Cameroon and Ivory Coast respectively. At the 2023 AFCON, Musa was an unused substitute throughout but his leadership role and positive influence on the team was widely acknowledged by the coach and players alike.

On 13 November 2021, Musa won his 101st international cap, surpassing the record previously held by Joseph Yobo.

On 17 December 2025, Musa announced his retirement from international career. Upon his retirement, he holds the record of the Nigerian most-capped footballer with 111 matches for the national team. (Note: Musa played in a match against Togo in 2017, but it is not recognised as an official international by FIFA because Nigeria made nine substitutions.)

== Personal life ==
In April 2017, Musa was involved in a dispute with his estranged wife Jamila, resulting in the police being called to his home. Shortly afterwards, the couple were divorced following "irreconcilable differences". On 23 May, Musa married Juliet Ejue in Abuja. On 24 January 2019, Musa confirmed the news of the death of his mother Sarah Musa on his Twitter page. She had previously been ill.

Musa who is a Muslim, faced criticism from Muslims for wishing a Merry Christmas to his instagram followers with a post captioning: "Compliments of the season This festive season, I pray that you experience true joy and peace and may things of celebration never cease from your household. Merry Christmas to you all". Whilst posting a picture of his Christian Wife next to a Christmas Tree.

Following the Criticism from Nigerian Muslims, Musa called on Nigerians to remember that "in the beautiful game, we stand united, transcending tribe and religion."

Musa also implored Nigerians to "join hands for peace, goals, and a brighter future."

== Business interests ==
In October 2017, Musa purchased a second petrol station in Nigeria, expanding his investments in the energy sector.

On February 1, 2021, Musa commissioned the Ahmed Musa Neighborhood Center, which is located in Kamazo, a suburb of Kaduna located in Chikun Local Government Area. The facility includes a gym, football pitch, and event space, and serves as a hub for youth development and community engagement.

== Career statistics ==
=== Club ===
As of match played 28 January 2024

Appearances and goals by club, season and competition
Club	Season	League			National cup (Note: Includes KNVB Cup, Russian Cup, FA Cup, King's Cup)		League cup (Note: Includes EFL Cup)		Continental		Other		Total	
Club	Season	Division	Apps	Goals	Apps	Goals	Apps	Goals	Apps	Goals	Apps	Goals	Apps	Goals
VVV-Venlo	2010–11	Eredivisie	23	5	0	0	—		—		4 (Note: Appearances in Eredivisie relegation play-offs)	2	27	7
VVV-Venlo	2011–12	Eredivisie	14	3	1	0	—		—		—		15	3
VVV-Venlo	Total		37	8	1	0	—		—		4	2	42	10
CSKA Moscow	2011–12	Russian Premier League	11	1	0	0	—		2 (Note: Appearances in UEFA Champions League)	0	—		13	1
CSKA Moscow	2012–13	Russian Premier League	28	11	5	4	—		2 (Note: Appearances in UEFA Europa League)	0	—		35	15
CSKA Moscow	2013–14	Russian Premier League	26	7	4	1	—		6	1	1 (Note: Appearance in Russian Super Cup)	0	37	9
CSKA Moscow	2014–15	Russian Premier League	30	10	2	0	—		6	1	1	0	39	11
CSKA Moscow	2015–16	Russian Premier League	29	13	4	1	—		10	4	—		43	18
CSKA Moscow	Total		124	42	15	6	—		26	6	2	0	167	55
Leicester City	2016–17	Premier League	21	2	4	2	1	0	5	0	1 (Note: Appearance in FA Community Shield)	0	32	4
Leicester City	2017–18	Premier League	0	0	0	0	1	1	—		—		1	1
Leicester City	Total		21	2	4	2	2	1	5	0	1	0	33	5
CSKA Moscow (loan)	2017–18	Russian Premier League	10	6	0	0	—		6	1	—		16	7
Al Nassr	2018–19	Saudi Pro League	24	7	3	2	—		0	0	4 (Note: Appearances in Arab Club Champions Cup)	1	31	10
Al Nassr	2019–20	Saudi Pro League	24	2	4	2	—		0	0	1 (Note: Appearance in Saudi Super Cup)	0	29	4
Al Nassr	2020–21	Saudi Pro League	2	0	0	0	—		0	0	0	0	2	0
Al Nassr	Total		50	9	7	4	—		0	0	5	1	62	14
Kano Pillars	2020–21	Nigeria Professional Football League	8	0	0	0	—		—		—		8	0
Fatih Karagümrük	2021–22	Süper Lig	31	2	3	2	—		—		—		34	4
Fatih Karagümrük	2022–23	Süper Lig	3	0	0	0	—		—		—		3	0
Fatih Karagümrük	Total		34	2	3	2	—		—		—		37	4
Sivasspor	2022–23	Süper Lig	17	0	4	0	—		3 (Note: Appearances in UEFA Europa Conference League)	0	—		24	0
Sivasspor	2023–24	Süper Lig	2	0	2	1	—		—		—		4	1
Sivasspor	Total		19	0	6	1	—		3	0	—		28	1
Career total			303	69	36	15	2	1	40	7	12	3	393	96

=== International ===
As of match played 28 May 2025

Appearances and goals by national team and year
National team	Year	Apps	Goals
Nigeria	2010	2	0
Nigeria	2011	10	1
Nigeria	2012	6	2
Nigeria	2013	17	2
Nigeria	2014	12	4
Nigeria	2015	9	2
Nigeria	2016	5	0
Nigeria	2017	5 (Note: Musa also appeared in one match against Togo in 2017, scoring two goals, however Nigeria made nine substitutions during this match, and therefore it is not recognised as an official match by FIFA.)	0
Nigeria	2018	13	4
Nigeria	2019	11	0
Nigeria	2020	4	0
Nigeria	2021	8	1
Nigeria	2022	4	0
Nigeria	2023	2	0
Nigeria	2024	1	0
Nigeria	2025	1	0
Total		110	16

As of match played 13 November 2021.
Scores and results list Nigeria's goal tally first, score column indicates score after each Musa goal.

List of international goals scored by Ahmed Musa
No.	Date	Venue	Opponent	Score	Result	Competition	Ref.
1	29 March 2011	National Stadium, Abuja, Nigeria	Kenya	1–0	3–0	Friendly	
2	16 June 2012	U. J. Esuene Stadium, Calabar, Nigeria	Rwanda	1–0	2–0	2013 Africa Cup of Nations qualification	
3	13 October 2012	U. J. Esuene Stadium, Calabar, Nigeria	Liberia	2–0	6–1	2013 Africa Cup of Nations qualification	
4	6 February 2013	Moses Mabhida Stadium, Durban, South Africa	Mali	4–0	4–1	2013 African Cup of Nations	
5	5 June 2013	Moi International Sports Centre, Kasarani, Kenya	Kenya	1–0	1–0	2014 FIFA World Cup qualification	
6	25 June 2014	Estádio Beira-Rio, Praia de Belas, Brazil	Argentina	1–1	2–3	2014 FIFA World Cup	
7	25 June 2014	Estádio Beira-Rio, Praia de Belas, Brazil	Argentina	2–2	2–3	2014 FIFA World Cup	
8	15 October 2014	National Stadium, Abuja, Nigeria	Sudan	1–0	3–1	2015 Africa Cup of Nations qualification	
9	15 October 2014	National Stadium, Abuja, Nigeria	Sudan	3–1	3–1	2015 Africa Cup of Nations qualification	
10	28 March 2015	Mbombela Stadium, Nelspruit, South Africa	South Africa	1–0	1–1	Friendly	
11	8 September 2015	Adokiye Amiesimaka Stadium, Port Harcourt, Nigeria	Niger	1–0	2–0	Friendly	
12	22 June 2018	Volgograd Arena, Volgograd, Russia	Iceland	1–0	2–0	2018 FIFA World Cup	
13	22 June 2018	Volgograd Arena, Volgograd, Russia	Iceland	2–0	2–0	2018 FIFA World Cup	
14	8 September 2018	Stade Linité, Victoria, Seychelles	Seychelles	1–0	3–0	2019 Africa Cup of Nations qualification	
15	16 October 2018	Stade Taïeb Mhiri, Sfax, Tunisia	Libya	2–0	3–2	2019 Africa Cup of Nations qualification	
16	13 November 2021	Stade Ibn Batouta, Tangier, Morocco	Liberia	2–0	2–0	2022 FIFA World Cup qualification	

== Honours ==
CSKA

- Russian Premier League: 2012–13, 2013–14, 2015–16
- Russian Cup: 2012–13
- Russian Super Cup: 2013, 2014

Al-Nassr

- Saudi Pro League: 2018–19
- Saudi Super Cup: 2019

Nigeria U20

- African Youth Championship: 2011

Nigeria

- Africa Cup of Nations: 2013; runner-up: 2023; third place: 2019
- WAFU Nations Cup: 2010

Individual

- Nigeria Premier League Top Scorer: 2009–10
- In the list of 33 best football players of the championship of Russia: 2012–13
- Russian Cup Top Scorer: 2012–13
- CAF Team of the Year: 2014

Orders

- Member of the Order of the Niger
- Officer of the Order of the Niger
