= Kasuwar Barci =

Marketplace in Kaduna state, Nigeria

- Location: Tudun Wada, Kaduna; 10.516°N 7.411°E
- Opening date: Monday
- Closing date: Sunday
- Owner: Kaduna state
- Interactive map of Kasuwar Barci

Kasuwar Barci Market is located at Tudun Wada in Kaduna South Local Government Area of Kaduna state, Nigeria. The postal code of Kasuwar Barci markets is 800261. The market is a place for wholesale and retail of buying and selling in Kaduna state.

== History ==
The market, formerly known as Tudun Wada Market, was established as a result of Kaduna central market reconstruction in 1973 when the traders were moved to Kasuwar Barci by the Government of Kaduna state.

Kasuwar Tudun Wada traders were renamed Kasuwar Barci because other markets around that time enjoyed more patronage and the traders were always idle and sleeping. A trader named Abdullah lamented on every stall about their lack of customers and suggested calling the market Kasuwar Barci, meaning Market sleeping as people only came to sleep. This was how Kasuwar Tudun wada was renamed. The market was built with shops in 1991.
