= Spotted lizard =

Spotted lizard may refer to several lizard species, including:

- Delalande's spotted lizard (Nucras lalandii)
- Blue-spotted lizard (Ninurta coeruleopunctatus)
- Red-spotted lizard (Mesalina rubropunctata)
- Small-spotted lizard (Mesalina guttulata)
- Yellow-spotted lizard (Lepidophyma flavimaculatum)

== See also ==
- Lizard (disambiguation)
