= Barnawa =

- Suburb
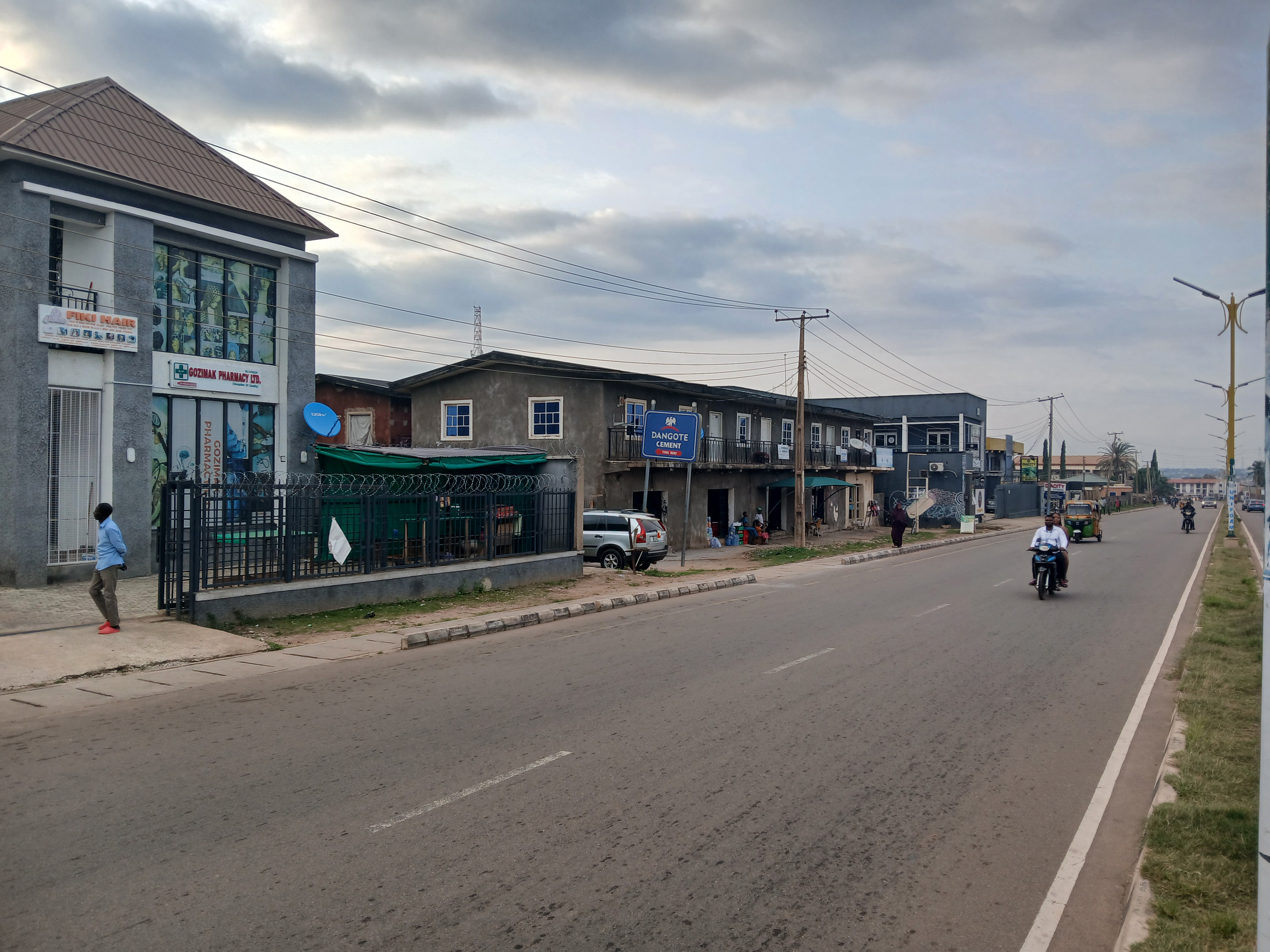
- Aliyu Makama Road by Narayi Junction Barnawa Kaduna

- Location within Nigeria
- Coordinates: 10°28′15.6″N 7°27′02.5″E
- Country: Nigeria
- State: Kaduna State
- LGA: Kaduna South
- City: Kaduna

Government
  - Type: Ward
- Time zone: UTC+01:00 (WAT)
- Postal code: 800
- Climate: Aw

Barnawa is an Administrative subdivisions Kaduna South Local Government situated within the Kaduna metropolitan area. of southern Kaduna State in the North West region of Nigeria. The postal code of the area is 800242. Barnawa is primarily a residential ward in Kaduna South, situated South of Kaduna River. It features a mix of low and high density housing, and serves as a bustling modern neighbourhood known for its local culture, nightlife and eateries.

== Main elements of Barnawa ==
1. Settlement type: merge formally planned residential territory with dense, high density core areas.
2. Demographics: as of recent studies, it was recognised as a major residential region within the Kaduna metropolitan area.
3. Location: part of Kaduna South local Government area(LGA).

=== LIFESTYLE CONSIDERATION ===
1. Religion and community: It is religiously vibrant, with notable mentions such as the living faith Church(Garden of faith)

2. Peaceful pace: Barnawa features a notably calm atmosphere.

3. Cost of living: It is relatively affordable, attracting young families and professionals.

== Localities ==
Barnawa includes several residential clusters and estates:

- Chalawa – A mixed-use area with mechanic workshops and small businesses.

- Shagari Low-cost – A government-developed housing estate named after President Shehu Shagari.

== Education ==
Barnawa hosts several notable schools, ranging from public secondary institutions to private international academies:

- Government Secondary School, Barnawa – A public school known for its participation in digital literacy programs.

- Great Panaf Schools – A private school offering nursery to secondary education.

- Kadwell International Schools – Known for high performance in national exams.

- Danbo International School – A long-established institution with strong extracurricular programs.

== Economy ==
Barnawa is known for several commercial activities ranging across shopping malls, night clubs, transport, and agricultural production, all of which provide job opportunities for the population in the state.

The economy of Barnawa is a vibrant mix of retail commerce, modern real estate development,small and medium enterprises(SMEs) and a thriving hospitality sector

== Geography ==
Barnawa is situated at an elevation of approximately 437 meters (1,437 feet) above sea level. It shares boundaries with Narayi, Television, and Sabon Tasha districts. The area is accessible via Aliyu Makama Road, which connects it to major parts of Kaduna city.

== Nightlife ==
Barnawa is known for its lively nightlife, offering a range of entertainment options from local bars to upscale lounges. The area attracts both residents and visitors seeking relaxation after work hours. Popular spots include viewing centres, music lounges, and nightclubs catering to diverse tastes.
