= Lizard (disambiguation) =

A lizard is a reptile.

Lizard, The Lizard, or Lizards may also refer to:

== Places ==
=== Australia ===
- Lizard Island, an island in the Coral Sea off the Cape York Peninsula
  - Lizard Island Airport
- Lizard Point (Queensland), an outcrop of rock in Australia
- Lizard, Queensland, a locality in the Shire of Cook

=== United Kingdom ===
- The Lizard, a peninsula in Cornwall, United Kingdom
- Lizard (village), a village on The Lizard
- Lizard Point, Cornwall, a headland on The Lizard, Cornwall
- Lizard complex, the ophiolite geology of The Lizard peninsula

=== Other places ===
- Lizard Creek (disambiguation), any one of several streams

== Music ==
- Lizard (album), a 1970 album by King Crimson
  - "Lizard" (song), the title track of the album
- Tenor cornett or lizard, a common musical instrument in the Renaissance and Baroque periods
- The Lizard (album), an album by Saigon Kick
- The Lizard (Sibelius), a 1909 composition
- The Lounge Lizards, a jazz group formed in 1978 by saxophone player John Lurie
- "The Lizards" (song), a song by Phish
- "Lizard", a single from Samia's 2025 album Bloodless (album)

== Fiction ==
- Lizard (character), a Marvel Comics character
- Lizards, alternate name of The Race, fictional aliens in the Worldwar series of stories
- Lizard (short stories), a collection of short stories by Banana Yoshimoto
- Lizard (film), a 2020 Nigerian film
- The Lizards, a 1963 Italian film
- The Lizard, also known as Marmoulak, a 2004 Iranian comedy film
- "Lizards" (Heroes), the second episode of the second season of the TV show Heroes

== Other ==
- Reptilian humanoids, humanoid reptiles from conspiracy theories associated with David Icke and others, popularly known as "Lizards"
- Lizard (camouflage), French military camouflage pattern
- The "Lizard", nickname of Dusty Baker, a former Major League Baseball player and manager
- The "Lizard", nickname of Tony Bloom, a professional poker player
- The constellation Lacerta, known as "The Lizard"
- The Military Organization Lizard Union, a Polish WWII anti-Nazi resistance group
- Lizards (game), a play-by-mail game run in the 1990s and 2000s

== See also ==
- Lounge lizard (disambiguation)
