= Makera =

Suburb of the city of Kaduna

- Suburb
- Location within Nigeria
- Coordinates: 10°28′17″N 7°24′36″E
- Country: Nigeria
- State: Kaduna State
- LGA: Kaduna South
- Time zone: UTC+01:00 (WAT)
- Postal code: 800
- Climate: Aw

Makera is the Kaduna South Local Government Area headquarters, a part of the city of Kaduna, the capital of Kaduna State in Northern Nigeria, Nigeria. The postal code of the area is 800251.

== Population ==
The area has an altitude of about 1,092 feet or 332 meters and a population of about 9,089.

== Average temperature ==
The hot season lasts for 2.1 months, usually from February to April, with an average daily high temperature above 92°F. The hottest month of the year in Makera is April, with an average high of 93°F and low of 71°F.

The cool season lasts for 3.4 months, usually from June to October, with an average daily high temperature below 84°F. The coldest month of the year in Makera is December, with an average low of 56°F and high of 85°F.

== Economic activities ==
Over the years, the Nigeria Breweries Plc engaged the youth and the women to increase the economic activities of Makera.
