= Kudaru =

- Town
- Location within Nigeria
- Coordinates: 10°38′N 08°28′E
- Country: Nigeria
- State: Kaduna State
- LGA: Lere
- Time zone: UTC+01:00 (WAT)
- Climate: Aw

Kudaru is a town in Lere Local Government Area in southern Kaduna state in the Middle Belt region of Nigeria. The postal code of the area is 811.

== Geography ==
The Kudaru ring complex was discovered to contain mildly alkaline fayalite granite porphyry, peralkaline arfvedsonite granite and metaluminous biotite granite, emplaced between 176.9 ± 2.5 and 180.55 ± 0.6 Ma. These rocks, typical of A-type granites "are characterized by variably high alkalis, HFSEs, Ga/Al ratios, and zircon saturation temperature".
