= Kabala West =

Suburb in Kaduna, Kaduna State, Nigeria

- Suburb
- Nickname: K/West
- Location within Nigeria
- Coordinates: 10°29′48″N 7°26′20″E
- Country: Nigeria
- State: Kaduna State
- LGA: Kaduna South
- City: Kaduna
- Time zone: UTC+1 (WAT)
- Postcode: 800263

Kabala West is a residential area in Kaduna, Nigeria. The Zip Code is 800263. It is a suburb of Kaduna and is under the Kaduna South Local Government Area of Kaduna State.

== Education ==
It has prestigious private schools such as Blessed Academy, Focus Academy, Betty Queen International School, as well as Arch. Namadi Sambo Government Secondary School. In 2020, some students were reported by This Day Live to have been involved in examination malpractice during a Senior Secondary Certificate Examination (SSCE) aptitude test organised by the NECO.

== Demographics ==
The dominant ethnic groups are those of Southern Kaduna origins (like the Atyap, Bajju, Ham and others), Igbo and Yoruba among others. It also has some populations of Ghanaians, Liberians and Sierra Leoneans. Dominant Religions are Christianity and Islam. Churches include 1st Ecwa Church, Ecwa Goodnews, Shalom Church, Sharonite Ministries, Christ Apostolic Church, Redeemed Christian Church of God (RCCG), Cherubim and Seraphim among others. There is a central mosque also in the community. The area had been involved in religious clashes in the past.

== Coordinate Location ==
Kabala West is located between the latitude of 10° 29' 48" N and longitude of 7° 26' 20 E

== Infrastructure ==
=== Transportation ===
==== Roads ====
The Western bypass road in the city of Kaduna which sees the passage of heavy vehicular traffic passes partly across Kabala West.

== Climate Condition ==
Kabala West Kaduna, experiences a tropical climate with hot weather and alternating rainy and dry seasons. Temperatures remain high throughout the year but changes depending on the season and time of day. At present, the area has warm conditions, low humidity, clear skies, and gentle southwesterly winds.
