= Geshere, Nigeria =

Geshere
- Town
- Location within Nigeria
- Coordinates: 10°07′42″N 08°21′51″E
- Country: Nigeria
- State: Kaduna State
- LGA: Kauru
- Time zone: UTC+01:00 (WAT)
- Postal code: 811
- Climate: Aw

Geshere is a town in Kauru Local Government Area, southern Kaduna state, Middle Belt, Nigeria. The postal code of the area is 811. The main ethnicity found here is the Avori people, who speak the TiVori language.

== Geography ==
The Geshere complex is an uncharacterized intrusive center in Nigeria with syenite and peralkaline granite. It has a sequence of rocks formed by magma crystallization.

== See also ==
- List of villages in Kaduna State
