= Saudatu Sani =

Nigerian politician

Hon Saudatu Sani Member of the House of Representatives from Kaduna State
- Born: 11 May 1954 (age 72)
- Education: Kaduna State Polytechnic
- Political party: PDP
- Other political affiliations: APC

Saudatu Sani (born May 11, 1954) is a Nigerian politician, Sarauniyar Saminaka (Queen of Saminaka).

In 2003 she was appointed as the Special Adviser to the wife of the governor. She was a member of the House of Representatives for Lere Federal Constituency of Kaduna State where she comes from on the PDP platform, later on she was re-elected for another term from 2007 to 2011. She was appointed Senior Special Assistant on MDGs by President Goodluck Jonathan. She was appointed as the board chairman of Kaduna State Contributory Health Management Authority. The Founder, Women and Youth Development Centre, Lere/Saminaka.

== Early life and education ==
Saudatu started formal education at Shekara Girls Primary School Kano, junior Secondary School, Kofan Gayan, Zaria, 1966 to 1968, senior secondary school at Government Girls' College Dala, Kano from 1969 to 1973. She continued her education in Kaduna Polytechnic from 1980 to 1985 where she read Dietetics, where she practiced her expertise in the Airforce Military Hospital and Yusuf Dantsoho Memorial Hospital, Kaduna. She was a teacher at Essence International School for three years.

== Career and Post ==
After her teaching experience, Saudatu held the post of Director General Women Commission from 1986 to 1992. From 199210 1994 she was the Caretaker Committee for Lere Local Government Council. The positions she held are: Member in the Board of Directors, Balera Micro Finance Bank. House Committee on Millennium Development Goals, House Committee on Women Affairs and Youth Development. Coordinator at network on Girl Child Education, Director Family Craft Centre, Kaduna, Matron, Joint Association of the Disabled, Commissioner, Board Of Commissioners, Kaduna, Member Board of Trustees, Advocacy Nigeria, African Parliamentarian Network for Good Governance and Poverty Reduction, Founding member, Board of Trustees of Millennium Hope for Women and the Less Privileged in Kaduna State, Board of Trustees, Lere Educational Institution, member Africa-Asia Pariiamentary Union, America-Canada Pariiamentary Association, Inter-Parliamentary Union, Geneva, Switzerland, Nigerian Future Health Systems, PRO Human Development Foundation of Nigeria, Federation of Muslim Women, Coordinator Women's Voice for Advocacy, Coordinator 100Group Nigeria.

== Awards ==
- The Most Effective Female Legislator in Nigeria, Pan-African Organization for Women Recognition South Africa, 2005
- Best Parliamentarian Award, Leadership Development Centre, Abuja, 2005
- Emancipator of Nigerian Youth Award, National Association of Medical Laboratory Sciences Students.
- Awards Of Excellence, Student Union Government of University of Jos.
- Award of a Model of Excellence, African Cultural Institute and Zenith Bank PIc.
- The Jewel in our Crown Award, National Women Mobilization Committee of the peoples Democratic Party (PDP), Abuja.
- Honorary Membership Award, Society of Gynecology and Obstetrics.
- Award for Management of Excellence, Nigerian Institute of Management.
- Nelson Mandela Gold Award for Leadership, Pan African Transparent Leadership Centre, South Africa.
