= Chikun kidnapping =

Mass kidnapping in July 2021 in Chikun, Nigeria

On 5 July 2021, an armed gang carried out a mass kidnapping in Chikun, Nigeria.

At approximately 1:45 am on 5 July 2021, a bandit gang kidnapped over 140 pupils from Bethel Baptist Secondary School in Kujuma, Chikun, Kaduna State, Nigeria. A total of 26 pupils and a teacher were later rescued.
