= Television (Kaduna South) =

Ward of the Kaduna South legislative council

Television is a suburb and an administrative subdivisions of Kaduna South local government area. Located in southern Kaduna State in the North West region of Nigeria, it is bordered by Barnawa to the North, Sabon Tasha to the East, Unguwan Romi to the South and Kakuri to the West. The area is a host to the Kaduna Polytechnic College of Administrative Studies and Social Sciences (CASSS). The postal code of the area is 800245.

== History ==
The area was once the location for the Kaduna State Television (KSTV) and the name was then used to referred to the place until today.

== Economic activities ==
Television is known for several commercial activities ranging across Hospitality, Night clubs, Transport, and Agricultural, all of which provide job opportunities for both residents and non-residents alike, especially areas around the Television Garage.
