= Gbiri-Niragu language =

Language of Nigeria

Gbiri-Niragu
- Gure-Kahugu
- Native to: Nigeria
- Region: Kaduna State
- Native speakers: (25,000 cited 2000)
- Language family: Niger–Congo?: Atlantic–Congo; Benue–Congo; Kainji; East Kainji; Gbiri-Niragu
- Dialects: Gbiri (Gure); Niragu (Kahugu)

Language codes
- ISO 639-3: grh
- Glottolog: gbir1241

Gbiri
- Person: uGbiri
- People: əGbiri
- Language: tuGbiri

Gbiri-Niragu, also known as Gure-Kahugu, is a Kainji language of Nigeria. Speakers are shifting to Hausa.

Tugbiri is the name of the language of the Gbiri people, and is spoken in and around the village of Gure in Lere LGA, southern Kaduna State. Aniragu speakers live directly to the north of Tugbiri speakers.

== Morphology ==
Singular and plural nouns are differentiated using alternating prefixes.

== Numerals ==
Gbiri-Niragu has, or had, a duodecimal number system.

	Aniragu	Tugbiri
1	inu	-də
2	bao	-ba
3	taro	-tar
4	nazo	-naaz
5	ishiko	kishii
6	tashi	kʊtashɨ
7	sunduri	kusundəri
8	nanas	kʊnaaz
9	kishanoas	kutururi
A_{12} (10)	akernaba	-ikeranaba
B_{12} (11)	kitishui	-lyem
10_{12} (12)	ripiri	-kpiri
