= Living room =

Room in a residential house for relaxing and socializing

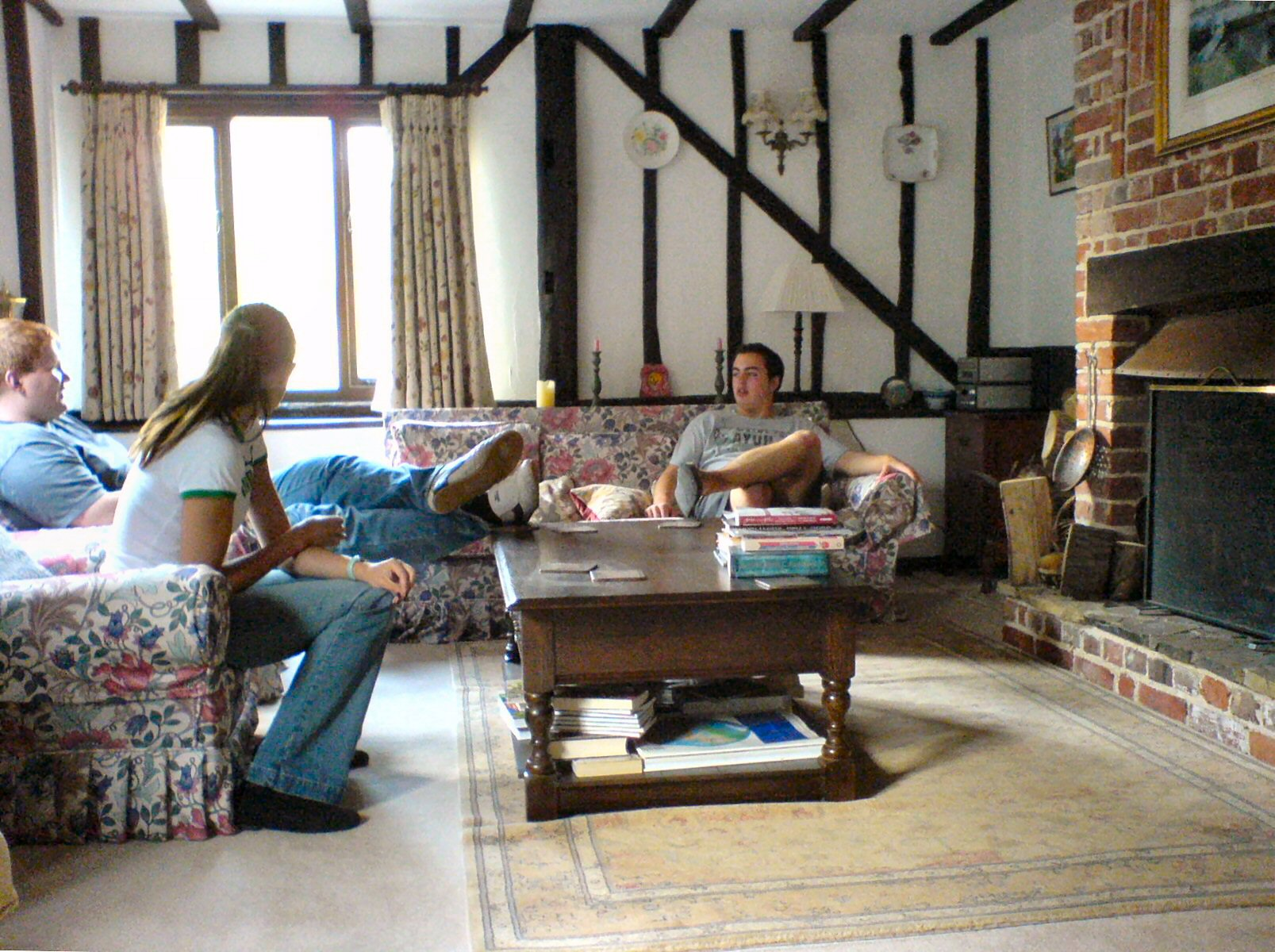
A Tudorbethan sitting room in the UK.

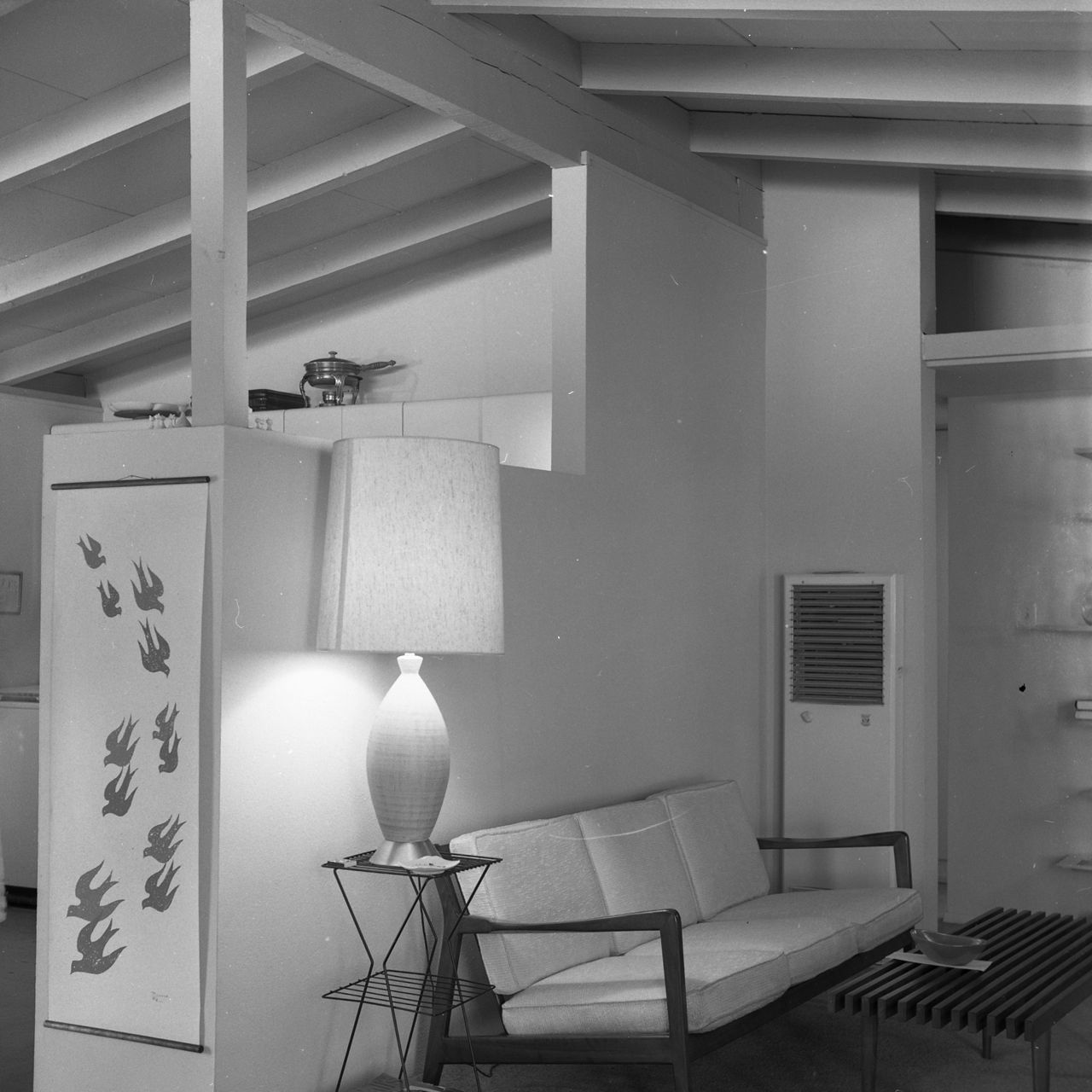
A California tract home living room, with a kitchen behind a permanent space divider, 1960.

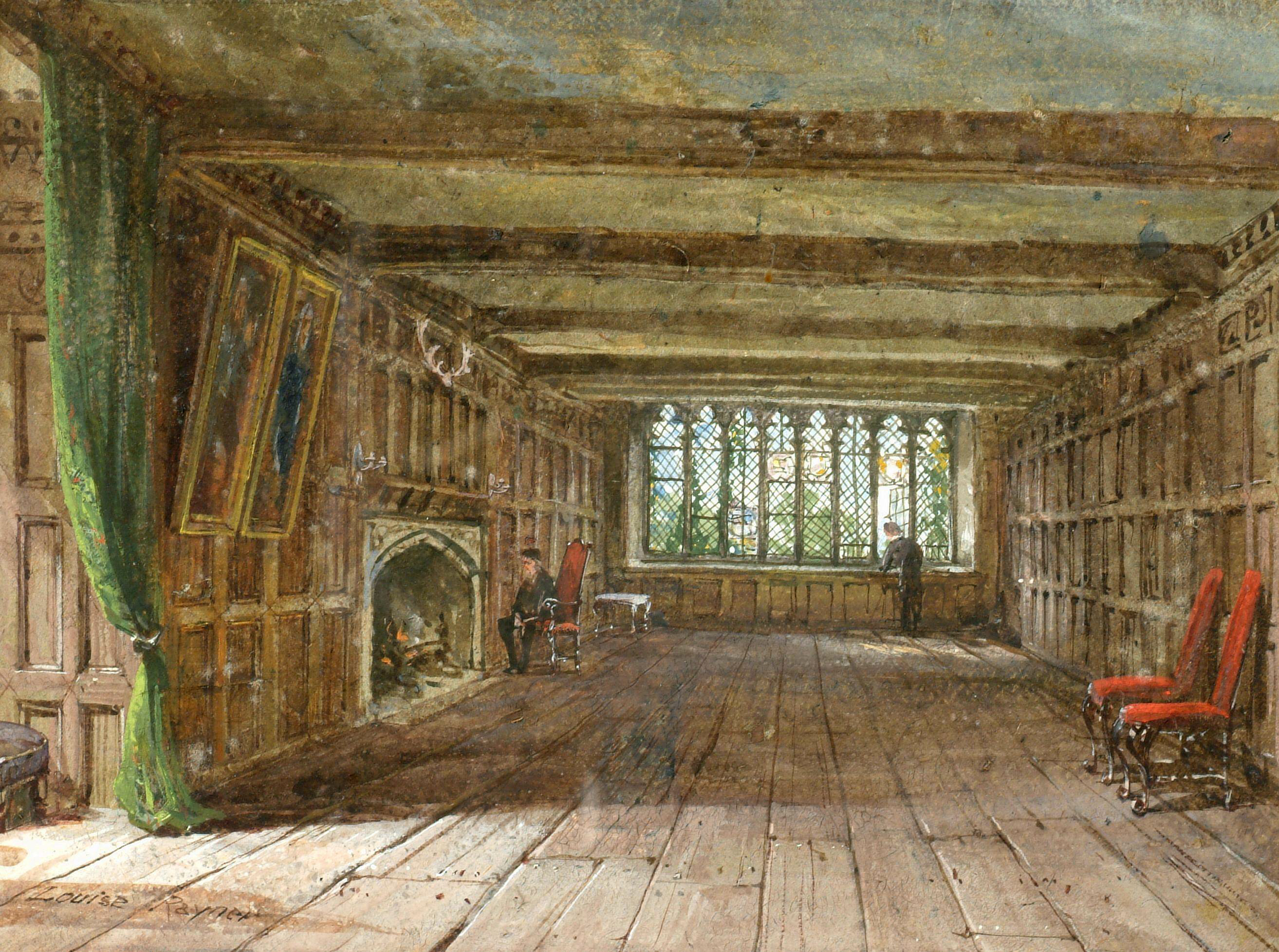
Louise Rayner, Tudor Style Interior at Haddon Hall, UK, 19th century.

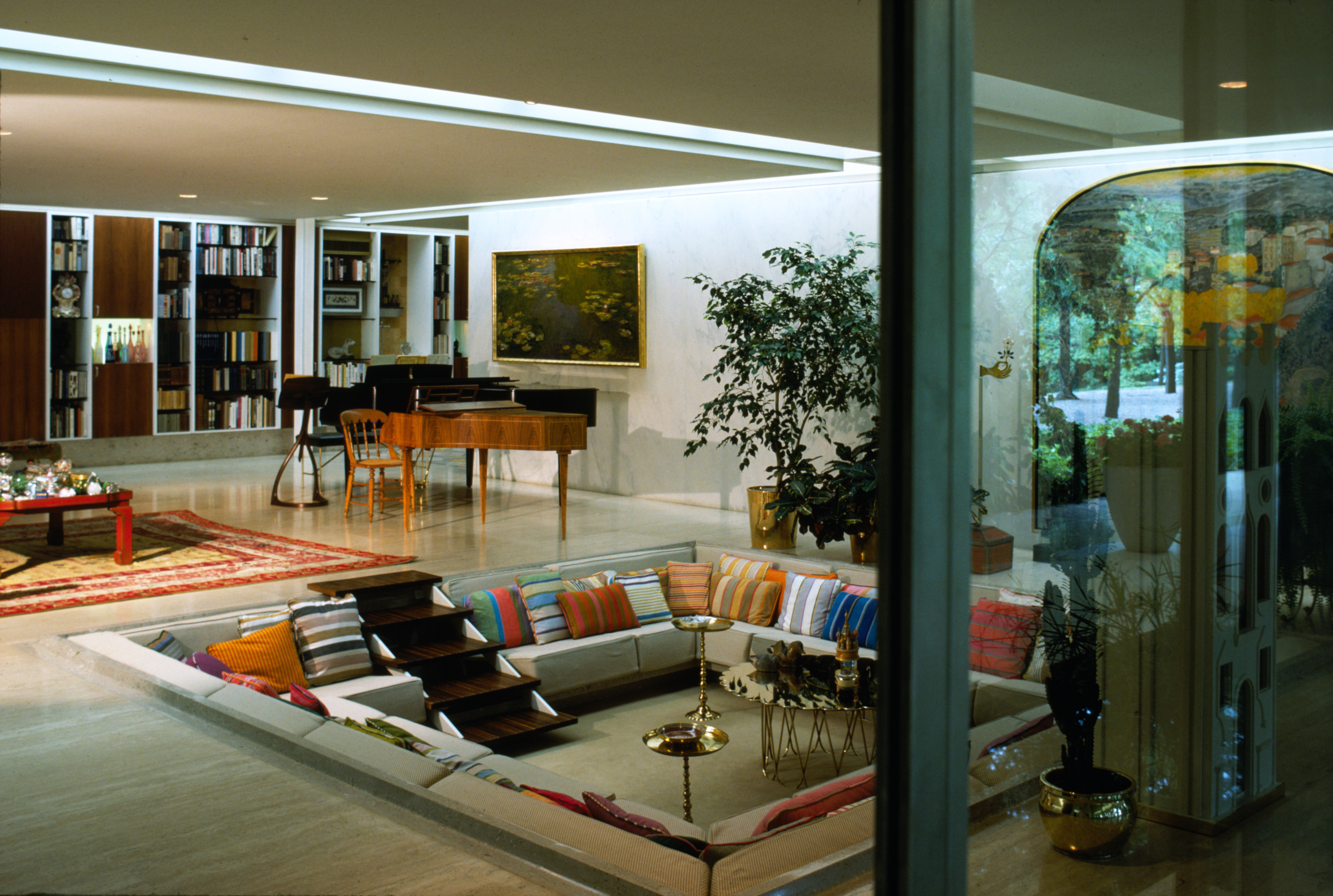
Miller House, Mid-century Modern, Columbus, Indiana, 1953–57, "Conversation Pit".

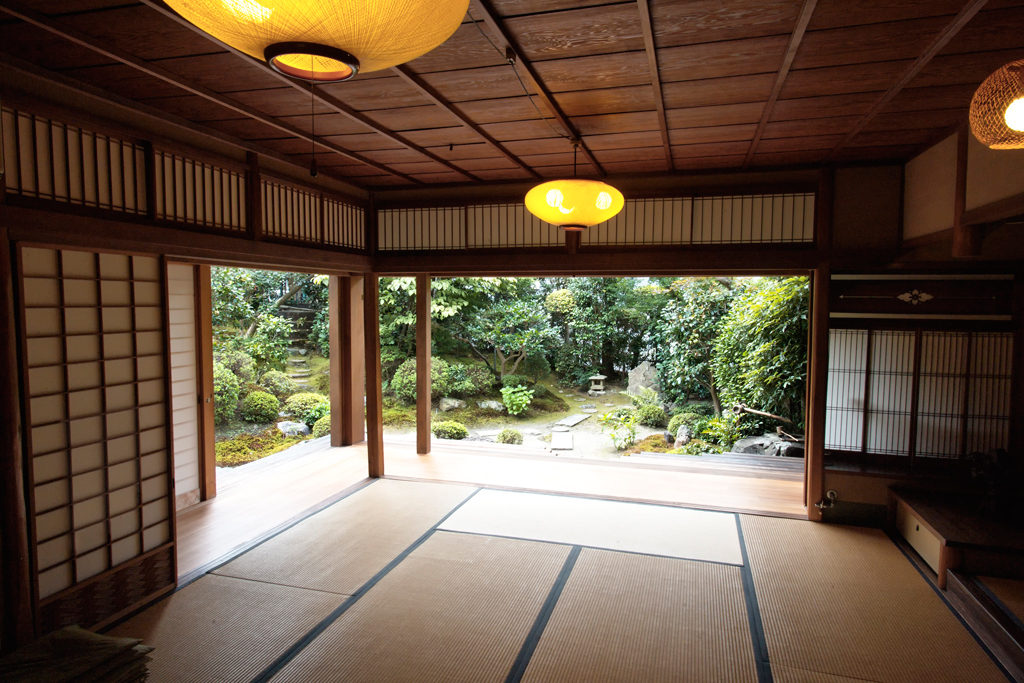
Japanese minimalist interior living room, 19th century.

In Western architecture, a living room, also called a lounge room (Australian English), lounge (British English), sitting room (British English), or drawing room, is a room for relaxing and socializing in a residential house or apartment. Such a room is sometimes called a front room when it is near the main entrance at the front of the house. In large, formal homes, a sitting room is often a small private living area adjacent to a bedroom, such as the Queens' Sitting Room and the Lincoln Sitting Room of the White House.

In the late 19th or early 20th century, Edward Bok advocated using the term living room for the room then commonly called a parlo[u]r or drawing room, and is sometimes erroneously credited with inventing the term. It is now a term used more frequently when referring to a space to relax and unwind within a household. Within different parts of the world, living rooms are designed differently and evolving, but all share the same purpose, to gather users in a comfortable space.

== Overview ==
In homes that lack a parlour or family room, the living room may also function as a drawing room for guests. Objects in living rooms may be used "to instigate and mediate contemplation about significant others, as well as to regulate the amount of intimacy desired with guests."

A typical Western living room may contain furnishings such as a couch, chairs, occasional tables, coffee tables, bookshelves, televisions, electric lamps, rugs, carpet, or other furniture. Depending on climate, sitting rooms would traditionally contain a fireplace, dating from when this was necessary for heating. In a Japanese sitting room, called a washitsu, the floor is covered with tatami, sectioned mats, on which people can sit comfortably. They also typically consist of shoji, fusuma, and ramas which allow for the space to be very minimalistic and cohesive. Japanese living room design concepts contradicted UK and New Zealand ideals in the way that Japanese culture believed in warming the person, instead of the home. This consisted of owning a portable hibachi for cooking needs rather than heating needs, meanwhile people in the UK and New Zealand used fireplaces to warm the space and not for cooking needs. Japanese cultural belief systems affected their design characteristics in the way that ornamentation should be minimal while incorporating natural elements.

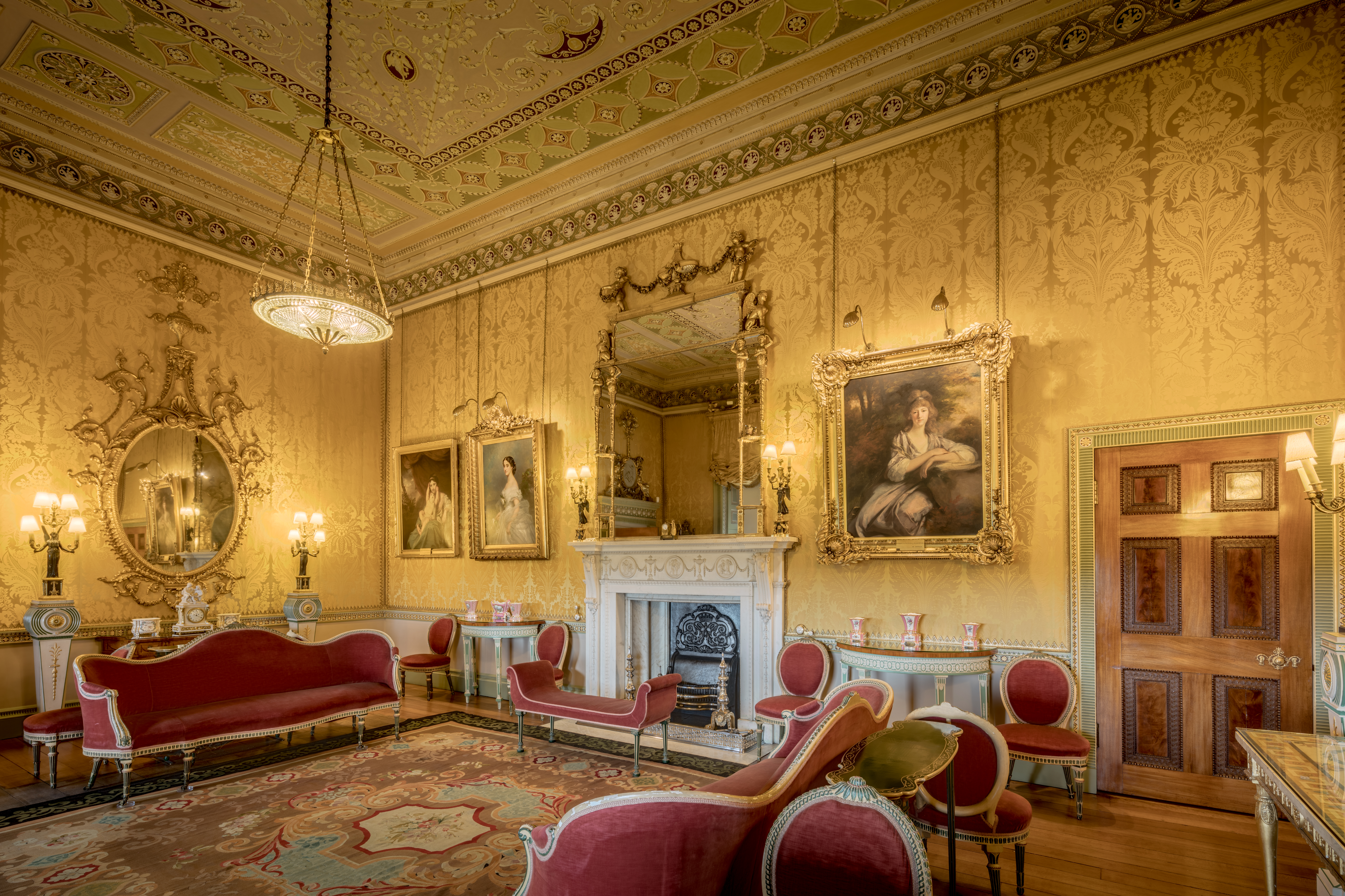
Drawing room at the Harewood House, 18th century.

== From parlour room to living room ==
Until the late 19th century, the front parlour was the room in the house used for formal social events, including where the recent deceased were laid out before their funeral. This room had only traditionally been used on Sundays or for formal occasions such as the ceremonies of deceased family members before proper burial; it was the buffer zone between the public and private area within the house. Sundays are now more typically used for watching football on large color televisions causing larger family rooms to become more popular during the 1970s. The term "living room" is found initially in the decorating literature of the 1890s, where a living room is understood to be a reflection of the personality of the designer, rather than the Victorian conventions of the day. Only the wealthy were able to afford several rooms within a space such as parlors, libraries, drawing rooms, and smoking rooms.

The change in terminology is credited to Edward Bok due to his accreditation of the magazine article, Ladies' Home Journal. The article was specifically targeted to women and provided them with reliance of popular content in relation to home design at an affordable price and Bok's vision of the ideal American household and the roles of the women. Bok strongly believed that the space should be "lived in" rather than having an expensively furnished room that was rarely used within the household. He had promoted the new name to encourage people to use the room in their daily lives as a gathering space.

== Evolution of the modern living room idea ==
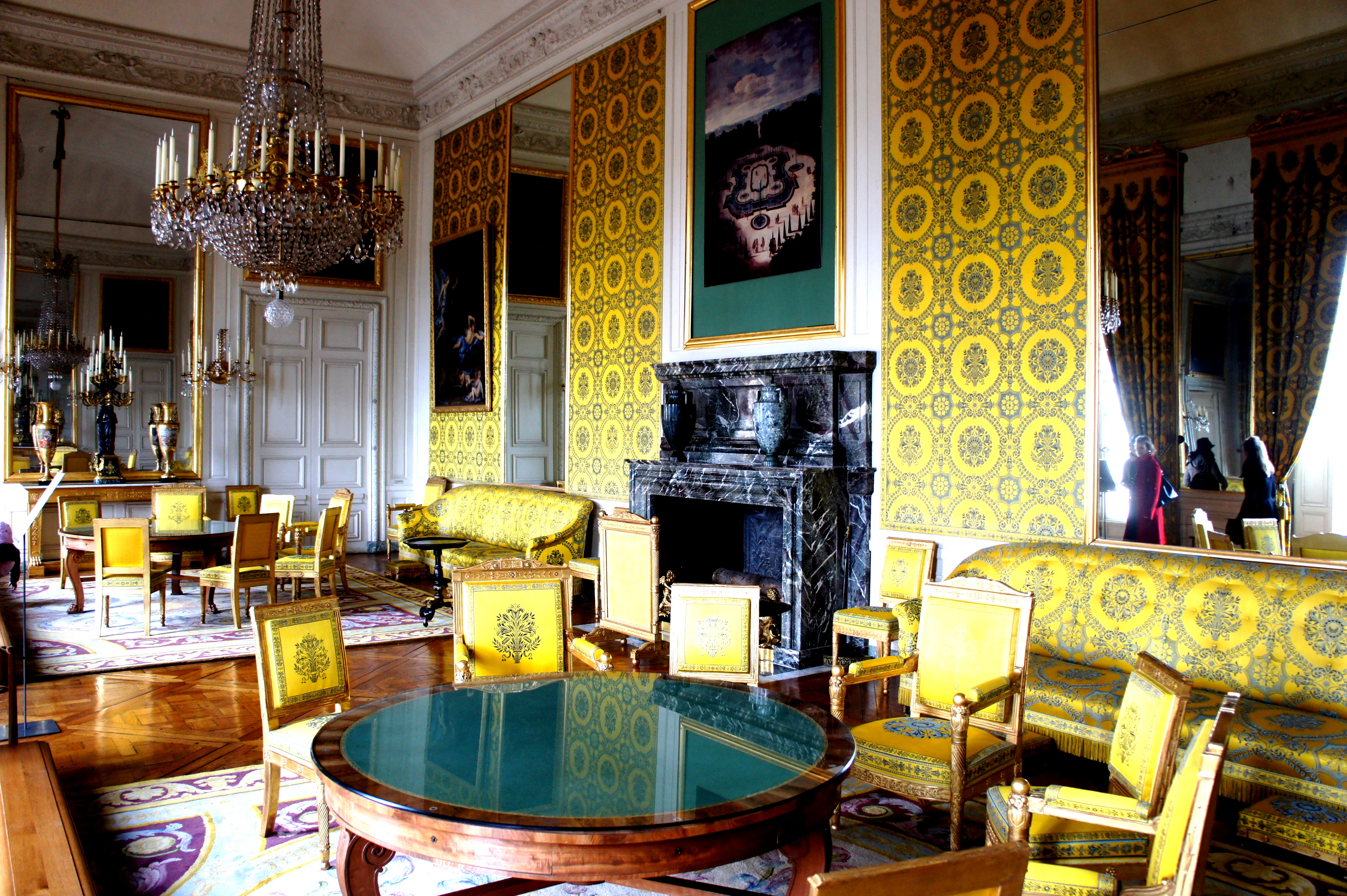
Grand Trianon, Palace of Versailles, Commissioned by King Louis XIV, 17th century.

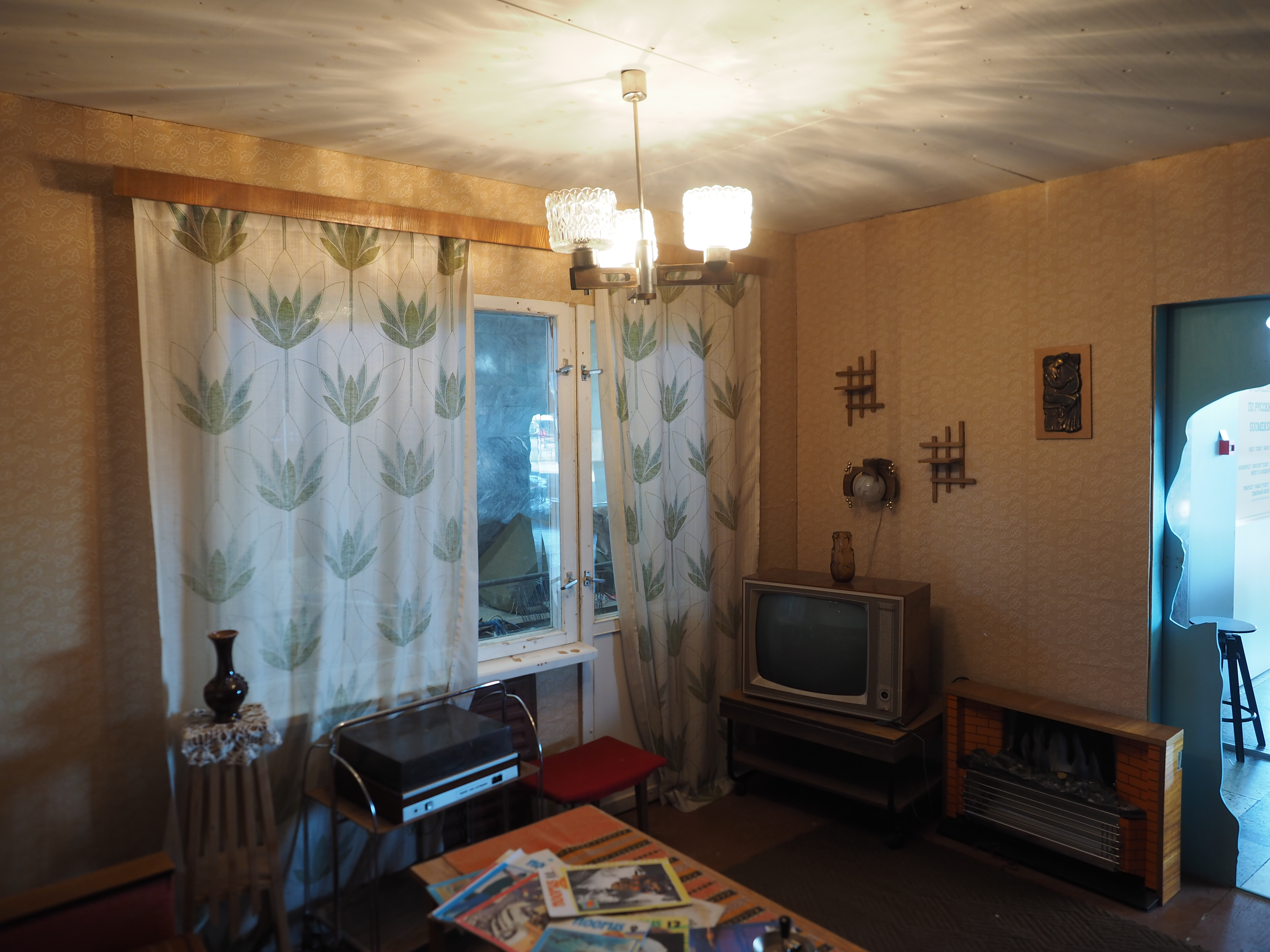
A reconstruction of a typical Soviet-era living room at a museum in Tallinn, Estonia.

Interior designers and architects throughout time have continuously studied users within a space to design to best fit their needs and wants. King of France, Louis XIV’s Palace of Versailles can be considered having one of the most lavishly decorated living rooms in the late 1600s. During King Louis XIV's reign, the architectural Louis XIV style or Louis Quatorze was established. This style can also be identified as the French Classicism and had an influence on other countries. It included the bold use of marble and bronze materials. Louis XIV worked alongside Louis Le Vau and Augustin-Charles d’Aviler to design appartments de parade, otherwise known as formal rooms that usually consisted of discussing and conducting business matters. They also designed, appartements de commodité, which were rooms that the homeowners could relax and lounge in. This style, known as the Louis XV style, or Louis Quinze, was designed intentionally to combine formality with a new level of comfort. Charles Étienne Briseux, French architect whose architectural style was prominently Louis Quinze, published Architecture moderne ou L’art de bien bâtir in 1728, introduced comfort which later became an obsession to have specific materiality and furnishings within the interior of a space. Its influenced began in Paris, France, and then quickly spread across Europe reaching the attention of the wealthy and lavish.

The Industrial Revolution emerged in the late 1700s which completely shifted America from an artisan and handmade process to a society that was dominated by a machine manufacturing industry. This allowed the production of chairs, tables, light bulbs, telegraphs, and radios that allowed society to purchase at a reasonable price to add into their home. The rise of the Industrial Revolution played a huge role in the advancement of the living room because due to mass production, decorative items became more available to the middle class.

An example of this evolution is the Miller House designed by Eero Saarinen. Saarinen knew that he wanted to design a living room not only with an appropriate architectural style but to feature "conversation pit" that sunk users to the ground making them feel a bit more "grounded." It encouraged relaxation and conversing which the Miller House was one of the first spaces to celebrate and introduce the conversation pit. The Miller House's architectural style was known as Mid-century modern, this indicated that it was introduced after World War II between 1945 and 1960. The movement was associated with minimal ornamentation, simplicity, honest materials, and craftsmanship.

== Architectural styles ==
Romanesque (800–1200):

- Thick walls
- Coffered ceilings
- Columns
- Neutral colors

Gothic (1100–1450):

- Stained glass windows
- Ribbed vaults
- Ornate decoration
- Pointed arches

Renaissance (1400–1450):

- Plasterwork
- Color and geometric patterns
- Fine wall paintings
- Richly decorated

Baroque (1600–1830):

- Luxuriously decorated
- Rich color palette
- Carved detailing
- High-end materials

Rococo (1650–1790):

- Pastel color palette
- Elaborate ornamentation
- Sensuous curvy lines
- Superior craftsmanship

Neoclassicism (1730–1925):

- Muted hues of color
- Simple and symmetrical furniture
- Decorative motifs
- Geometric patterns

Art Nouveau (1890–1914):

- Inspiration from nature
- Flamboyant color palette
- Sensuous curvy lines
- Decorative and ornamental

Beaux Arts (1895–1925):

- Highly decorative surfaces
- Focus on symmetry
- Curves and arches
- Columns and detailed surfaces

Neo-Gothic (1905–1930):

- Emphasis on vertical elements
- Natural lighting
- Stained glass windows
- Highly detailed surfaces

Art Deco (1925–1937):

- Rich colors
- Bold geometry
- Decadent detail work
- Stylized geometric motifs

Modernist Styles (1900–present):

- Simplicity
- Clean lines
- Natural lines
- Mixture of bold and neutral colors

Postmodernism (1972–present):

- Bold colors
- Asymmetrical
- Exaggerated scale
- Unnatural materials

Neo-Modernism (1997–present):

- Angles over curves
- Monochrome or vibrant
- Experiment with shapes
- Use metallic and eco materials

Parametricism (1997–present):

- Neutral colors
- Large in scale
- Sensuous lines
- Natural materials

== See also ==
- Drawing room
- Lobby
- Lounge (disambiguation)
- Parlour
