= Mozes Adams =

Nigerian footballer (born 1988)

Personal information
- Full name: Moses Adams
- Date of birth: 21 July 1988 (age 38)
- Place of birth: Saminaka, Kaduna State, Nigeria
- Height: 1.89 m (6 ft 2 in)
- Position: Central midfielder

Team information
- Current team: Ironi Tiberias

Senior career*
Years	Team	Apps	(Gls)
2004–2007	Ranchers Bees		
2007–2012	KVC Westerlo	70	(1)
2013–2014	R. Cappellen F.C.	17	(0)
2015–	Ironi Tiberias	4	(0)

International career
2007	Nigeria U-20	5	(0)
- * Club domestic league appearances and goals

Mozes Adams (born 21 July 1988 in Saminaka, southern Kaduna State, Nigeria) is a Nigerian footballer. Adams plays in the central midfield and last played for KVC Westerlo in Belgium.

== Career ==
He moved on 2 January 2007 from Ranchers Bees to K.V.C. Westerlo. In summer 2012 was released by Westerlo and trained with R. Cappellen F.C. After a season with knee problems, signed first in summer 2013 for R. Cappellen F.C. in January 2015 moses joined to club Ironi Tiberias from Israel.

== International career ==
Adams was member of the Nigeria U-20 at 2007 FIFA U-20 World Cup in Canada.
