= Aminu Maigari =

Nigerian football administrator

Aminu Maigari is a Nigerian football administrator who served as the 38th President of the Nigeria Football Federation from 2010 to 2014 following his sack on the grounds of “financial misappropriation, misapplication and maladministration”.
