= River Delimi =

River in Nigeria

River Delimi River Dilimi
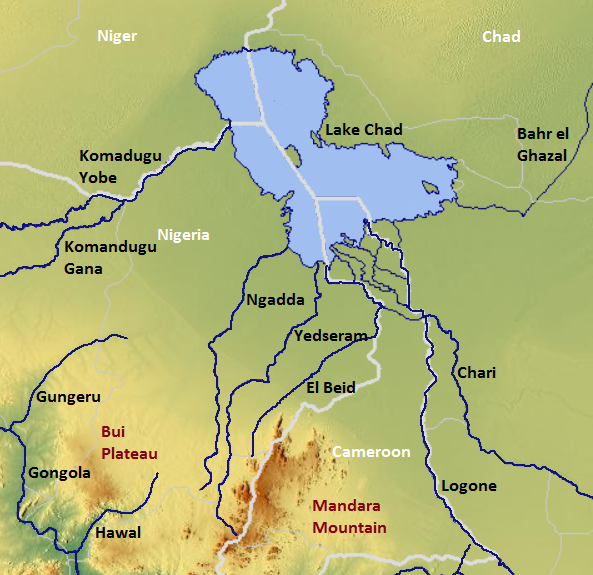

Location
- Countries: Nigeria

Physical characteristics
- Source
  - coordinates: 09°51′56″N 8°55′24″E
  - elevation: 1,310 m (4,300 ft)
- Mouth: Lake Chad
- Discharge
  - average: 163 m^{3}/s (5,800 cu ft/s)

River Delimi also spelled River Dilimi is a river on the Jos Plateau in Plateau State, Nigeria. It is the principal drainage system of the city of Jos and one the headwater rivers of the Lake Chad Basin.The river originates from treams on the Jos Plateau and flows northeast through several states before eventually contributing to the Yobe River system which empties into Lake Chad.

== Course ==
River Dilimi rises on the Jos Plateau and flows through the urban area of Jos, including Katon Rikkos, Tudun Wada, Farin Gada, Gangare, the University of Jos Permanent Site, and the University of Jos Students' Village. The river continues northeastward through Plateau State before entering neighbouring states, where sections of the drainage system are associated with the Hadejia, Jama'are, Komadugu, and Yobe river systems as they flow to Lake Chad.

== Economic important ==
River Dilimi supports agriculture throughout its floodplain. These communities depend on the river for irrigation, domestic water supply, livestock watering, fishing, vegetable farming, and other economic activities. Its fertile alluvial soils make it one of the most productive agricultural corridors in the Jos metropolitan area.

== Environment issues ==
Rapid urbanization, mining, and industrial development have affected the quality of the River Dilimi. Scientific studies have reported pollution from domestic sewage, mining waste, agricultural runoff, and heavy metals in parts of the river. Seasonal flooding has also become a major environmental concern within the Delimi catchment because of blocked drainage channels and the expansion of settlements onto floodplains.

== Environmental context ==
River Delimi supports agriculture throughout its floodplain. Farmers cultivate vegetables, maize, and other crops using water from the river, particularly during the dry season.

== Name ==
The names Dilimi and Delimi refer to the same river. According to local historical accounts, the river's name originated from the Berom word Dulim, meaning ( dark enclosure ) or a dark creek. Early visitors and Hausa speakers rendered the name as Dilimi or Delimi, resulting in the two spellings found in modern literature.
