= Kujama =

- Town
- Location within Nigeria
- Coordinates: 10°27′N 07°38′E
- Country: Nigeria
- State: Kaduna State
- LGA: Chikun
- Time zone: UTC+01:00 (WAT)
- Postal code: 800
- Climate: Aw

Kujama is the Chikun Local Government Area headquarters, in southern Kaduna state in the Middle Belt region of Nigeria. The postal code of the area is 800. It has a population of about 12,967.

== Coordinate location ==
Kujam in the chikun local government area is located between the longitude 10° 27' 27" N

== Climate condition ==
The weather conditions of Kujama are relatively hot by day and cold by night.

== See also ==
- List of villages in Kaduna State
