= Lounge =

Lounge may refer to:

== Architecture ==
- Lounge, the living room of a dwelling
- Lounge, a public waiting area in a hotel's lobby
- Lounge, a style of commercial alcohol-bar
- Airport lounge or train lounge (e.g., Amtrak's Acela Lounge), a premium waiting area for passengers
- Dome lounge, a type of domed railroad passenger car that includes lounge, cafe, dining or other space on the upper level

== Arts, entertainment, and media ==
- Book cafe, or lounge
- Piano bar, or lounge
- Lounge music, type of easy listening music popular in the 1950s and 1960s
- RTL Lounge, a Dutch television channel

== Fashion ==
- Lounge suit, style of suit (clothing)
  - Lounge jacket, also called a suit jacket or suit coat, part of a lounge suit

== Businesses and organisations ==
- Lounge (company), a British underwear and clothing brand
- Loungers, a British cafe-bar and restaurant chain

== Other uses ==
- Chaise lounge, an English language derivative of the French term chaise longue ("long chair")
- Lounge car, a railroad car selling food and beverages

== See also ==
- Lounge lizard (disambiguation)
- Lounging (disambiguation)
