= Mariri, Kaduna State =

Mariri
- Town
- Location within Nigeria
- Coordinates: 10°02′N 08°31′E
- Country: Nigeria
- State: Kaduna State
- LGA: Lere
- Ward: Garu Mariri
- Time zone: UTC+01:00 (WAT)
- Postal code: 811
- Climate: Aw

Mariri is a town in Garu Mariri, Lere Local Government Area, Northern Senatorial District Kaduna State, Nigeria. It is located 131 km from the state capital, Kaduna. The postal code of the area is 811.

== See also ==
- List of villages in Kaduna State
