= Lizard Creek =

Lizard Creek may refer to:

== in Canada ==
- Lizard Creek (Elk River), a tributary of the Elk River in British Columbia

== in the United States ==
- Lizard Creek (Iowa), a stream
- Lizard Creek (Pennsylvania), a tributary of the Lehigh River
