= Kaduna South =

Kaduna South Kaduna ta Kudu^{(Hausa)} Ka̱duna Ka̱tak^{(Jju)} Ka̱duna A̱tak^{(Tyap)}
- LGA
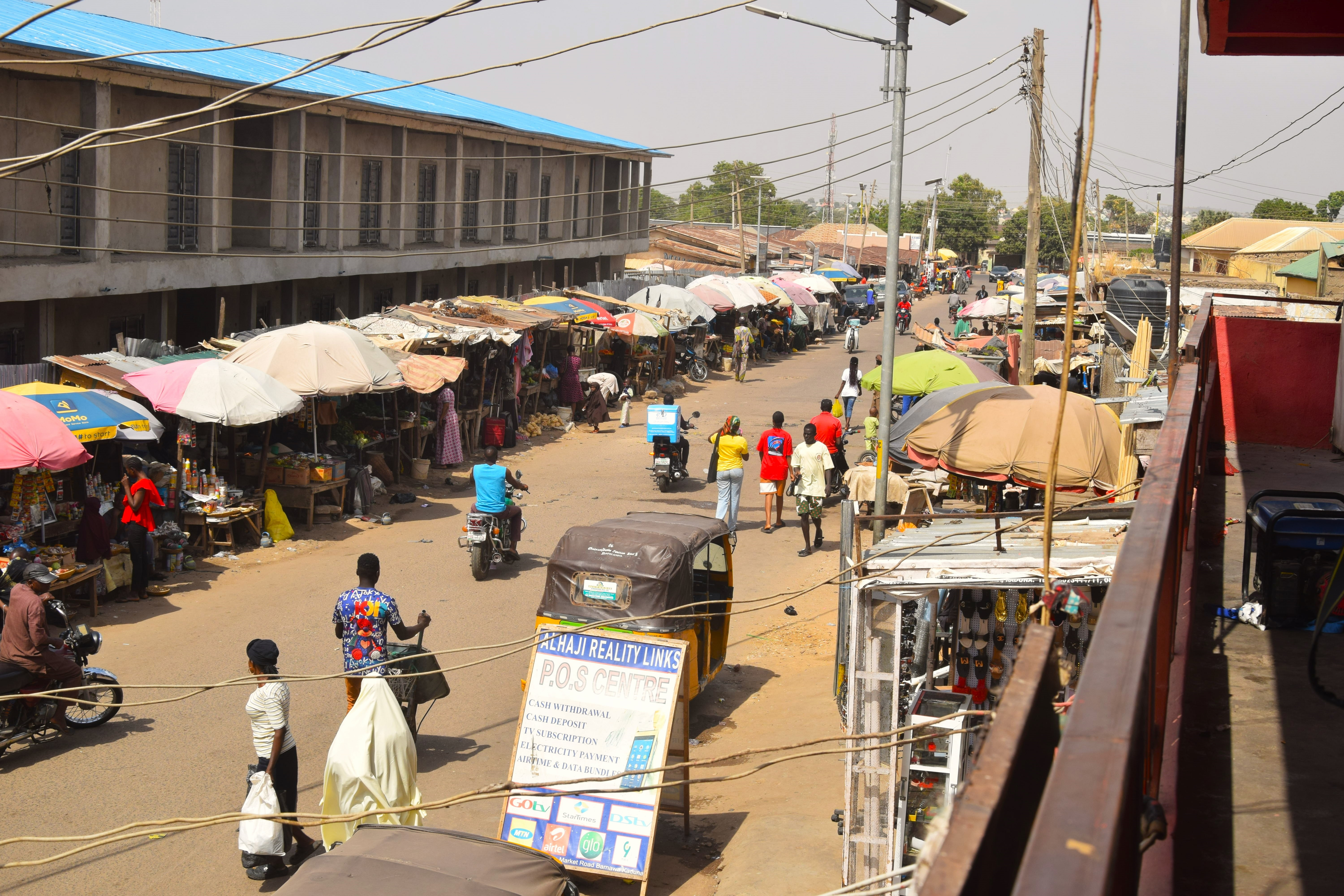
- A street in Barnawa market
- Interactive map of Kaduna South
- Country: Nigeria
- State: Kaduna State
- Headquarters: Makera, Kakuri.

Government
  - Executive chairman: Rayyan Hussein

Area
  - Total: 46.2 km^{2} (17.8 sq mi)
- Elevation: 650 m (2,130 ft)

Population (2006)
  - Total: 402,731
  - Density: 11,799/km^{2} (30,560/sq mi)
- Time zone: UTC+1 (WAT)
- Postal code: 800
- ISO 3166 code: NG.KD.KS

Kaduna South is a Local Government Area in the Kaduna Metropolis of Kaduna State, Nigeria. Its headquarters is located in Makera Kakuri. Other wards are Barnawa, Tudun Wada, Tudun Nupawa, Television (Kaduna), Kakuri, Unguwar Muazu, Kinkinau, Kabala West, Sabon Gari (Kaduna south), Badikko, Unguwar Sanusi and Kurmin Mashi. It has an area of about 46.2 km^{2}. The postal code of the area is 800282.

== Boundaries ==
Kaduna South Local Government Area (LGA) shares boundaries with three Local Government Areas: Kaduna North LGA to the north, Chikun LGA to the south and Igabi LGA to the northwest, respectively. The local government is chaired by Hon. Rayyan Hussain.

== Administrative subdivisions ==
Kaduna South Local Government Area consists of 13 subdivisions (second-order administrative divisions or Wards), namely:

1. Badiko
2. Barnawa
3. Kakuri Gwari
4. Kakuri Hausa
5. Makera
6. Sabon Gari North
7. Sabon Gari South
8. Television
9. Tudun Nupawa
10. Tudun Wada North
11. Tudun Wada South
12. Tudun Wada West
13. Unguwan Sanusi

== Demographics ==
It has an area of about 46.2 km^{2} and a population of 402,731 as of 2006 census.

=== People ===
The area has a mixed population, comprising Nigerian ethnic groups amongst which include: Adara, Tyap, Bajju, Gbagyi, Ham, Hausa, Idoma, Igala, Igbo, Nupe and Yoruba, amongst others, practicing different religion.

== Geography ==
With an average temperature of 33 degrees Celsius or 91.4 degrees Fahrenheit, Kaduna South Local Government Area has a total size of roughly 59 square kilometres. With an estimated elevation of 650 metres (2,130 ft) above sea level, the Local Government Area's landscape is primarily flat. The two main seasons in Kaduna South Local Government Area are the dry and the rainy seasons.

=== Climate condition ===
Kaduna South has a tropical climate, with significantly less rainfall in winter than in summer. This climate is classified as Aw according to the Köppen-Geiger system. The average temperature is 25.2 °C (77.4 °F), with annual precipitation of approximately 998 mm (39.3 in). The climate is moderate, with summers that are not easily defined.

== Economic Activities ==
Trade is a vital feature of the economy of Kaduna South, where a variety of commodities are bought and sold in its markets: The Makera market in Kakuri, and Kasuwar Barci in Tudun wada. The important enterprises engaged in by the people include trading, rearing of animals and craftsmanship.

== Schools in Kaduna South ==
1.Danbo international schools

2. Henas International Schools

3. Kadwel International Schools

4. Funmi Schools Barnawa Kaduna

5. Godshield Private School

6. The Fortress Academy

7. Government College Kaduna. https://www.finelib.com/listing/Government-College-Kaduna/85323/

8. Government Girls Secondary School Maimuna Gwarzo.

== Locations ==
Kakuri Hausa is a populated settlement in Kaduna South Local Government Area of Kaduna State, Nigeria, forming part of the Kaduna South region and the wider Kaduna metropolis where residents live and engage in social and economic activities. The area is located at approximately 10° 28′ 30″ North latitude and 7° 25′ 10″ East longitude (10.47511°N, 7.41959°E) and experiences a tropical savanna (Aw) climate characterized by distinct wet and dry seasons.

== See also ==
- Kaduna
- Southern Kaduna
