= Tudun Wada, Kaduna =

Part of the city of Kaduna

Tudun Wada
- Suburb
- Location within Nigeria
- Coordinates: 10°30′44″N 7°24′44″E
- Country: Nigeria
- State: Kaduna State
- LGA: Kaduna South

Population (2006 Census)
  - Total: 376,100
- Time zone: UTC+01:00 (WAT)
- Postal code: 800
- Climate: Aw

Tudun Wada is a suburb in Kaduna South Local Government Area located in the city of Kaduna, the capital of Kaduna State in Northern Nigeria, Nigeria. The postal code of the area is 800. Tudun Wada is also a ward that is part of the Kaduna South local government.

== History ==
The name Tudun Wada was derived from Hausa words: Tudu (hill) and Wada (richness), the area was originally settled by British colonists to make up segregated towns for northerners who were not local residents.

Kaduna was established in 1924 as a result of inflow of people from different part of the country coming to Kaduna to fine source of living. The population in the area are not Hausa but different ethnic groups such as Igbo, Tiv, Yoruba.

== Economy activity ==
Kasuwar Barci markets are popular for people outside Kaduna for the wholesale and retail sellers of bales of items. The market contribution to the economy development of the Kaduna South local government and the entire Kaduna state development. The market are open every day.

Zango cattles market & Livestock Trade: Located close to Zango in Tudun Wada.This is one of Kaduna's most prominent livestock and cattles markets, driving significant inter- state trade in cattles, goats, sheep and related goods

== Population ==
Tudun Wada is a densely populated area in Kaduna state with 376,100 population in 2022.

Tudun Wada's 2026 population is now estimated at 425,924

== Other locations ==
Other locations sharing the name include:

- Tudun Wada, Kano
- Tudun Wada, Zaria

Also to be noted is that some other cities in Northern Nigeria have neighborhoods with the same name. This is similar to towns and cities having a section named Sabon Gari.

== Climate conditions ==
Tudun Wada has a tropical climate with a wet and dry season. The weather is hot all year round, with partly cloudy skies during the dry season and overcast conditions during the wet season. The average annual temperature is between 54 °F (12 °C) and 98 °F (37 °C), though it can occasionally fall below 48 °F (9 °C) or soar beyond 103 °F (39 °C). The coldest month is usually January, with average highs of 86 °F (30 °C) and lows of 55 °F.

== Institutions in Tudun Wada ==
- Kaduna state college of nursing sciences, tudun wada, Kaduna state
- Kaduna state federal polytechnic
- Kaduna State College of Nursing & Midwifery
- Sheikh Abubakar Gumi collage

== See also ==
- List of villages in Kaduna State
