= Lounge lizard (disambiguation) =

A lounge lizard is an idle person or musician who spends inordinate time in nightclubs and cocktail lounges.

Lounge lizard may also refer to:

- Austin Lounge Lizards, a band from Austin, Texas formed in 1980
- The Lounge Lizards, a jazz group formed in 1978 by saxophone player John Lurie
  - The Lounge Lizards (album), a 1981 album by The Lounge Lizards
- Lounge Lizards (EP), a 2011 EP by Purling Hiss
