= Saminaka =

- Town
- Saminaka
- Street view of Saminaka
- Interactive map of Saminaka
- Location of Saminaka in Nigeria
- Coordinates: 10.412266°N 8.687477°E
- Country: Nigeria
- State: Kaduna State
- Local Government Area: Lere
- Time zone: UTC+1 (WAT)
- Postal code: 811104

Saminaka is a town in Kaduna State, Nigeria, and the administrative headquarters of Lere Local Government Area. It is also the seat of the Saminaka Emirate Council..

== History ==
Historical research on the Lere area describes the region around Saminaka as suitable for agriculture and livestock production, with access to fertile land and water contributing to settlement in the area. The name "Saminaka" has been interpreted in historical research as meaning "get your own".

Saminaka later became an administrative centre in the area. Ahmadu Bello University research documents the existence of Saminaka Local Government Area during the late 1970s and 1980s, with Saminaka serving as its administrative centre.

Following later local-government reorganisation, Saminaka became the administrative headquarters of Lere Local Government Area.

== Administration ==
Saminaka serves as the administrative headquarters of Lere Local Government Area in Kaduna State.

The town is also the seat of the Saminaka Emirate Council. The Emir's Palace is located in Saminaka.

== Geography ==
Saminaka is the administrative headquarters of Lere Local Government Area in Kaduna State. Lere LGA is bordered by Kauru Local Government Area to the west and south and Kubau Local Government Area to the northwest. It shares interstate boundaries with Doguwa Local Government Area of Kano State to the north, Toro Local Government Area of Bauchi State to the east, and Bassa Local Government Area of Plateau State to the southeast.

== Economy ==
Agriculture and agricultural trade are important economic activities in Saminaka and the surrounding area. Saminaka Market forms part of the agricultural produce distribution network in Kaduna State and serves as a market for agricultural commodities including maize, soybeans and sorghum.

The Kaduna State Agricultural Development Agency maintains its Lere Agricultural Zonal Headquarters at Sabon Birni, Saminaka.
