= Gure, Nigeria =

Village in Kaduna State, Nigeria

Gure Gbiri
- Town
- Location within Nigeria
- Coordinates: 10°19′09″N 08°22′53″E
- Country: Nigeria
- State: Kaduna State
- LGA: Lere
- District: Gure-Kahugu (Gbiri-Niragu)
- Time zone: UTC+01:00 (WAT)
- Postal code: 800
- Climate: Aw

Gure (endonym Gbiri) is a village in Lere Local Government Area, southern Kaduna state in the Middle Belt region of Nigeria. The postal code of the area is 811. Here temperatures can go as low as 23°C and as high as 32°C, with an elevation of 910 m. It's located closest to Kahugu village.

== See also ==
- List of villages in Kaduna State
