= Narayi =

- Suburb
- Location within Nigeria
- Coordinates: 10°28′15.6″N 7°27′02.5″E
- Country: Nigeria
- State: Kaduna State
- LGA: Chikun
- City: Kaduna

Government
  - Type: Ward
- Time zone: UTC+01:00 (WAT)
- Postal code: 800
- Climate: Aw

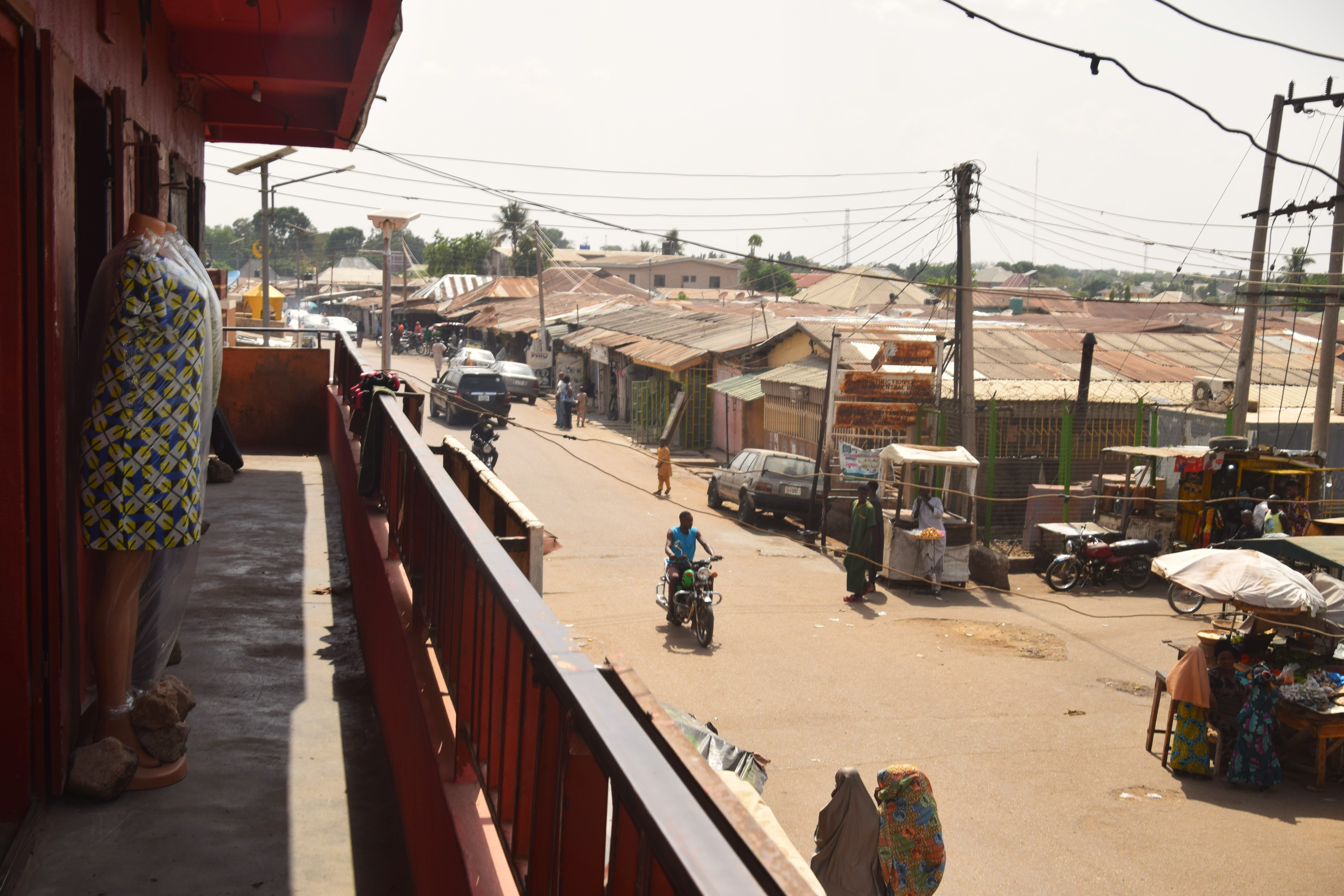
Narayi, Commercial area

Narayi is a suburb of Kaduna city. It's situated in Chikun Local Government Area of southern Kaduna State in the Middle Belt region of Nigeria. The postal code of the area is 800. Places within Narayi include Highcost, Bayan Dutse, and Shagari Low-cost.

== Schools ==
Narayi is a residential area with some known schools within the suburb. These include both government and privately owned schools as follows;

1. Government Day Secondary School, Narayi.
2. LGEA Primary School, Narayi.
3. EWCA Goodnews Schools, Narayi
4. Ideal International Schools, Narayi.
5. Alpha Model School, Chikun 6.WORLD HARVEST ACADEMY (EXCEL ACADEMY SCHOOLS)

== Activities ==
Narayi economic area which include,

1. Narayi market place,
2. Worship centers,
3. Game centers,
4. Petrol stations,
5. Relaxation centers.

== Industries ==
- Bim 33 international limited
- lumos laboratories and company
- Herbal correction
- Marketing insight consultancy service limited
- zealot global investment limited

== Average Temperature ==
Narayi is an administrative subdivisions within Chikun local government with an average temperature of range of 55°F to 100°F.

== Hospital ==
1. Harmony Hospital and Specialists Clinics
2. Salvation Hospital Narayi, Chikun
3. Model Health Clinic - Narayi (Tbl)
