= Chikun =

Local government area in Kaduna State, Nigeria

- LGA
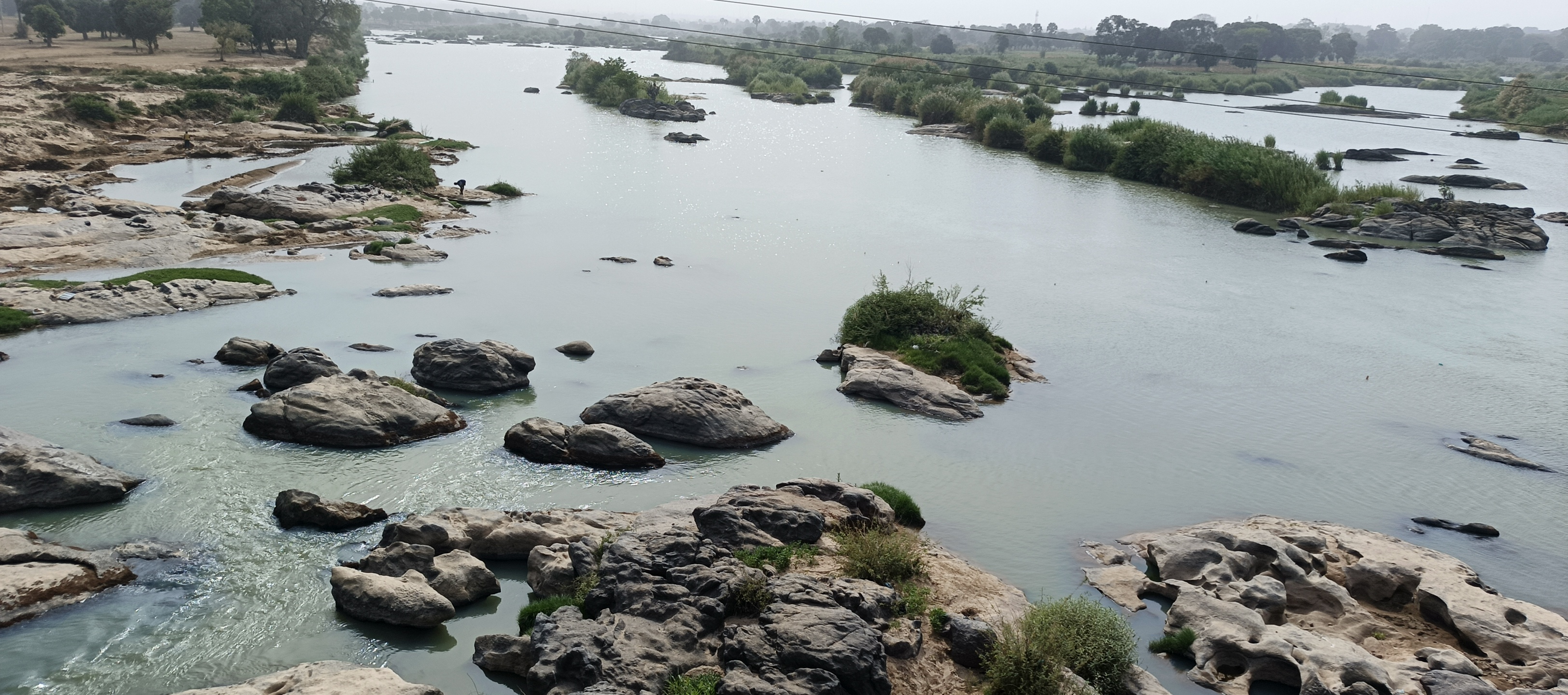
- Imagery of Kaduna river along Karji, Chikun
- Motto: Home of Peace and Hospitality
- Interactive map of Chikun
- Location within Nigeria
- Coordinates: 10°17′06″N 7°06′37″E
- Country: Nigeria
- Local Government Area: Nigeria
- State: Kaduna State
- Headquarters: Kujama

Government
  - Type: Democracy
  - Executive Chairman: Samaila Leeman

Area
  - Total: 4,466 km^{2} (1,724 sq mi)

Population (2006)
  - Total: 372,272
  - Density: 112.5/km^{2} (291/sq mi)
- Time zone: UTC+1 (WAT)
- ISO 3166 code: NG.KD.CH

Chikun is a Local Government Area in central Kaduna State, Nigeria. It has an area of about 4,466 km^{2}, and had a population of 372,272 as of the 2006 census. Its headquarters is located in the town of Kujama. The postal code of the area is 2438000.

== Boundaries ==
Chikun Local Government Area (LGA) shares boundaries with Kachia LGA to the south, Kajuru LGA to the east, Kaduna South LGA to the northeast, Igabi LGA to the northeast, Birnin Gwari LGA to the northwest; and Munya LGA to the south and Shiroro LGA to the west, all of Niger State to west, respectively.

== Climate/Geography ==
In Chikun Local Government Area, the wet season is oppressive and largely cloudy, the dry season is partly gloomy, and it is hot year round. The average range of temperatures is 55 °F to 100 °F.

Chikun Local Government Area has an average yearly temperature of 33 degrees Celsius or 91.4 degrees Fahrenheit and a total area of 4,645 square kilometres (or 1,724 square miles). There are two distinct seasons in the area: the rainy season begins in May and peaks in September, and the dry season runs from October to April.

== Economy ==
Chikun Local Government Area residents rely primarily on agriculture for their livelihood, with a wide range of crops being farmed there. Weaving textiles, producing mats, and pottery are some of the other significant economic activities in Chikun Local Government Area. There are other markets in the neighborhood, and the trade sector is thriving as well.

== Cultural festival ==
There are several cultural festivals that are celebrated annually in the Chikun Local Government Area of Kaduna State as found below:

=== Kaburu Dance Festival ===
This festival involves a traditional dance drama by the indigenous Gwari tribe that has to do with performing drama through dancing. At the end of it all, an intended message is passed.

== Administrative subdivisions ==
Chikun Local Government Area consists of 12 subdivisions called Wards (second-order administrative divisions), namely:

- Chikun ward
- Gwagwada ward
- Kakau ward
- Kujama ward
- Kunai ward
- Kuriga ward
- Narayi ward
- Nassarawa ward
- Rido ward
- Sabon Gari Nassarawa ward
- Sabon Tasha ward
- Yelwa ward

== Schools ==
This area has both public and private schools which are

- Enebita Schools
- Holy Child School
- Sufan Academy
- Incubators Academy
- Yason Schools
- Tubase International School
- World Class Schools
- Living School International School
- Total Child Mission School
- Kings International School
- Onic International School
- Maranathan Children School
- Royalseal School International School
- Rhoda Academy
- Extol Kidsides Center
- Hamda International School
- Zerephat Academy
- Ideal International School
- Shephard Heritage International Academy
- Tomorrow Leaders School
- Blessed Topday Academy
- Heritage Nursery and Primary
- Merveille Academy
- Darchrt International Schools
- Alpha Model School
- Fradapal El Shaddai School
- Zikaa S International Schools
- Gidan Sambo LGEA Primary School
- Government Junior Secondary School Romi
- Government Junior Secondary School Katarm
- Government Junior Secondary School Narayi
- Faith Acedemy Kaduna
- Junior Secondary School Rido
- Government Junior Secondary School Rido
- Junior Secondary School Chidinu
- B A T C Kakau
- Government Junior Secondary School Kankomi,
- Government Secondary School Sabon Gayan
- Junior Secondary School Chikun
- Government Junior Secondary School Babban Saura
- Government Junior Secondary School Kaduna
- Government Secondary School Nasarawa
- Fatima Girls Secondary School
- PCC College
- Government Science Secondary School Narayi
- Government Secondary School Kujama
- Government Day Secondary School Sabon Tasha
- Joy Internatinal College
- Government Secondary School Udawa
- Government Secondary School
- Queens College Kujama
- Bethel Baptist School
- Sacret Heart Primary and Secondary School
- Hope Comprehensive School

== History ==
Chikun Local Government Area derives its name from a Gbagyi village named Chikun in the southeastern part of Kujama. The area was originally populated by the Gbagyi people but is now being subsumed by urbanization making it a cosmopolitan part of Kaduna.

On 5 July 2021, over 100 secondary school pupils from Bethel Baptist Secondary School in Chikun were kidnapped.

== Demographics ==
=== Population ===
Chikun Local Government Area according to the March 21, 2006 national population census was put at 372,272. Its population was projected by the National Population Commission of Nigeria and National Bureau of Statistics to be 502,500 by March 21, 2016.

=== People ===
The indigenous people are the Gbagyi people. They also make up the major population in the area.

== Kingship ==
The traditional ruler is The Esu Chikun, His Royal Highness Isyaku Yari (Sa Gbagy II) Gbagyi. The jurisdiction of the royal Chief covers the entire Chikun Local Government Area and parts of Kaduna South Local Government Area of Television village and Romi New Extension.

== See also ==
- List of villages in Kaduna State
