= List of castles in Africa =

This list of castles in Africa includes castles, forts, and mock castles in Africa.

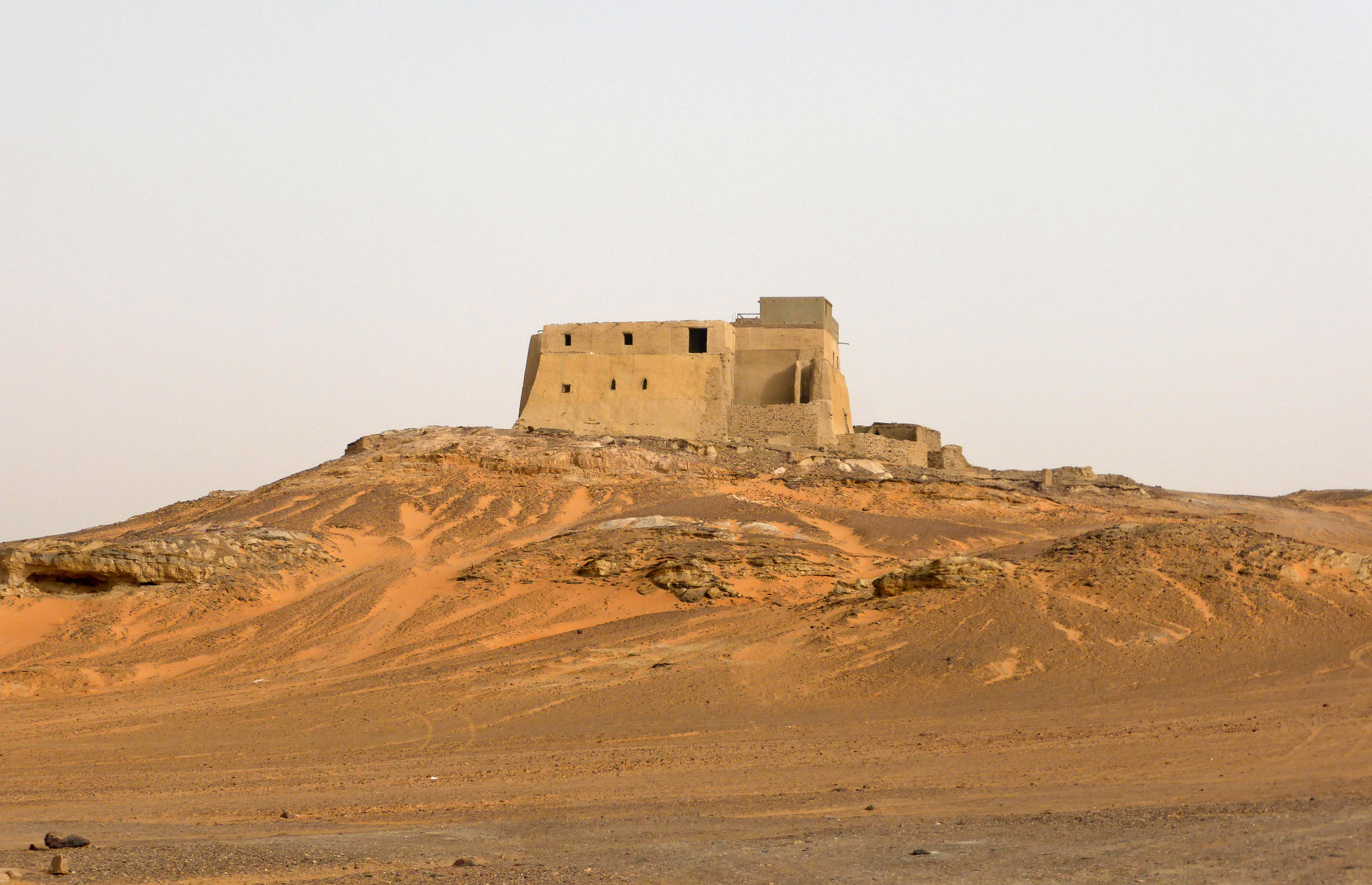
The Throne Hall of Dongola, in Sudan built in the 9th century

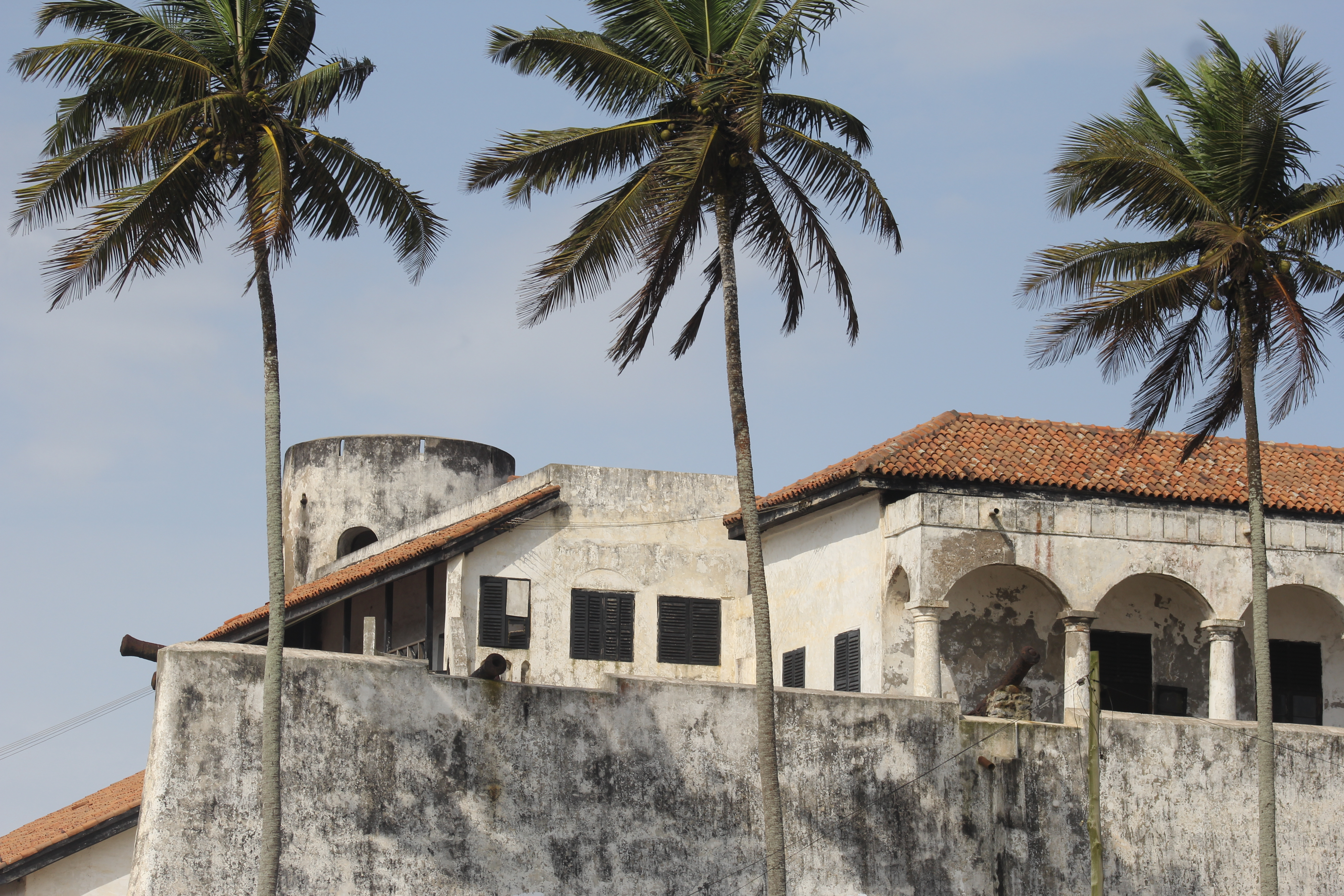
The oldest extant European building in Sub-Saharan Africa; Elmina Castle, Ghana; built in 1482

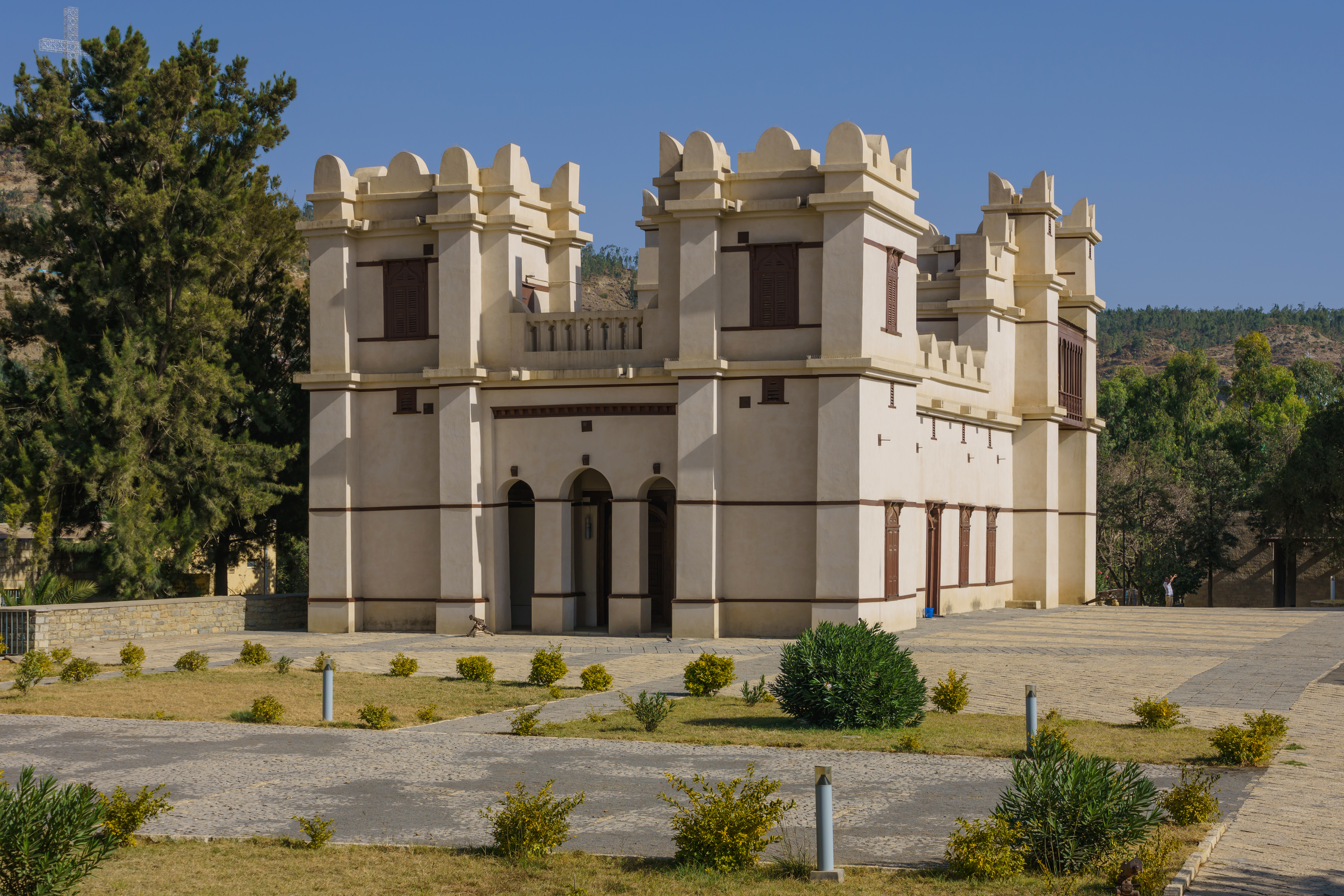
Yohanes IV Palace, built in the 19th century

== Angola ==
- Fortaleza de São Miguel (1641–1648)
- Fort Naulila, Cunene Province
- Fort Cuangar, Cunene Province

== Egypt ==
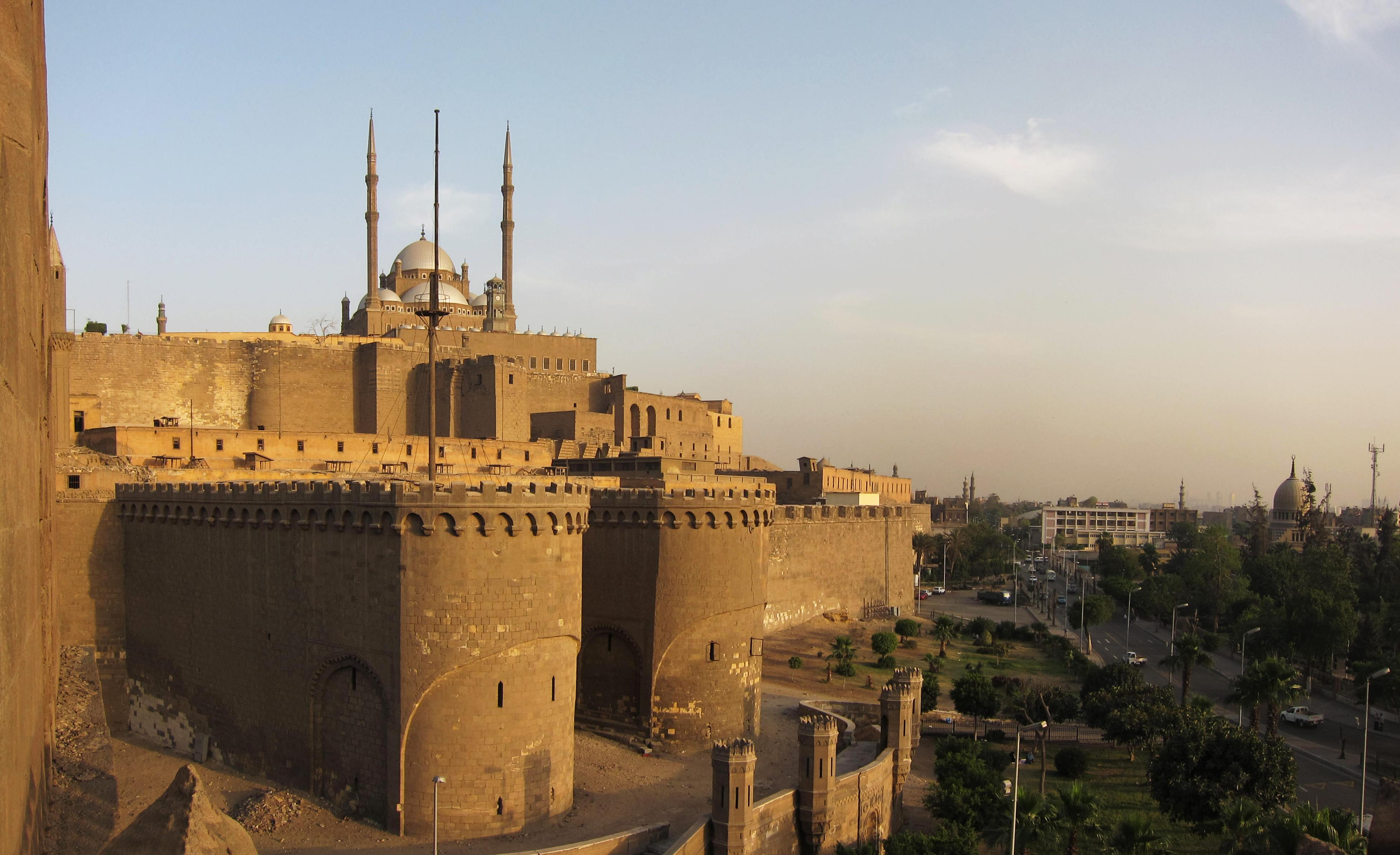
Cairo Citadel, in 2010.

- Cairo Citadel (12th century)
- Citadel of Qaitbay (15th century)

== Ethiopia ==
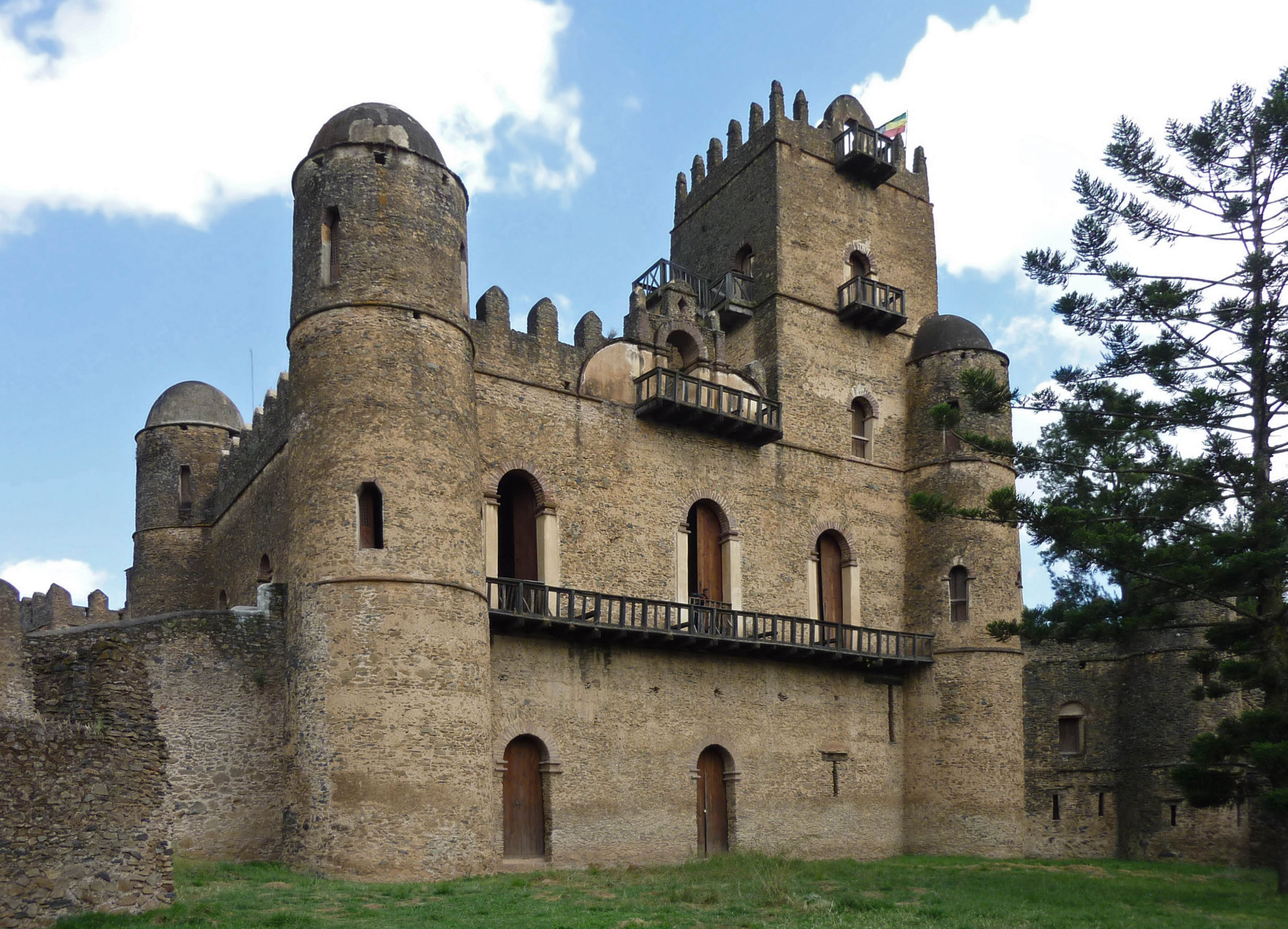
Fasiledes's castle, Fasil Ghebbi, Gondar.

- Fasil Ghebbi, Gondar (17th century)
- Guzara Castle, Emfraz

== Gambia ==
- Fort James (1651)
- Fort Jillifree, Jufureh

== Ghana ==
- Cape Coast Castle, Cape Coast (1688–1782, April 1659 – May 1659)
- Elmina Castle, Elmina (1482)
- English Fort (Fort Vrendenburg), Komenda (1785–1871)
- Fort Amsterdam, Abandze, Cormantin (1665–1721, 1785–1867)
- Fort Apollonia, Beyin (16??–16??, 1868–1871)
- Fort Batenstein, Butri (1656–1665, 1666–1871)
- Fort Crêvecoeur, Accra (1649–1782, 1785–1867/8)
- Fort Dorothea, Akwida (1687–1698, 1711–1712, 1732–1804)
- Fort Good Hope (Fort Goedehoop), Senya Beraku (1667/1705–1782, 1785–1868)
- Fort Hollandia (1725–1815, previously Gross-Friedrichsburg, part of the former Brandenburger Gold Coast settlements), sold to the Dutch by Prussia
- Fort Metal Cross (Metaal Kruis), Dixcove (1868–1871)
- Fort Nassau, present Moree (1598/1611–1664, 1665–1782, 1785–1867)
- Fort Oranje, Sekondi (1640–1871)
- Fort Patience (Fort Leydsaemhyt), Apam (1697–1782, 1785–1868)
- Fort Prinzenstein, Keta
- Fort Saint Antony, Axim (February 1642 – 1664, 1665–1671)
- Fort San Sebastian, Shema (1637–1664, 1664–1871)
- Fort St. Jago (Fort Conraadsburg), Elmina
- Osu Castle (Fort Christiansborg), Osu, Accra

== Kenya ==
- Fort Jesus, Mombasa, Kenya (1593–?)
- Thimlich Ohinga, Migori, Kenya (c. 500 – 1400)
- Lord Egerton's castle, Nakuru Kenya

== Libya ==
- Cyrene Citadel
- El Tag, Kufra Oasis (mid 1930s)
- Fort Capuzzo
- Ghat Fortress
- Sabha Citadel
- Saraya El Hamra, Tripoli

== Madagascar ==
- Fort Flacourt, Tolanaro (1643)
- Fort lalana Sylvain Roux, Île Sainte-Marie (1753)
- Fort Rova, Majunga (1824)
- Fort Voyron, Antananarivo (1940–1945)
- Windsor Castle, Antsiranana (1940–1945)

== Mozambique ==
- Fort São Caetano, Sofala (1505)
- São Sebastião (1558–1608)

== Namibia ==
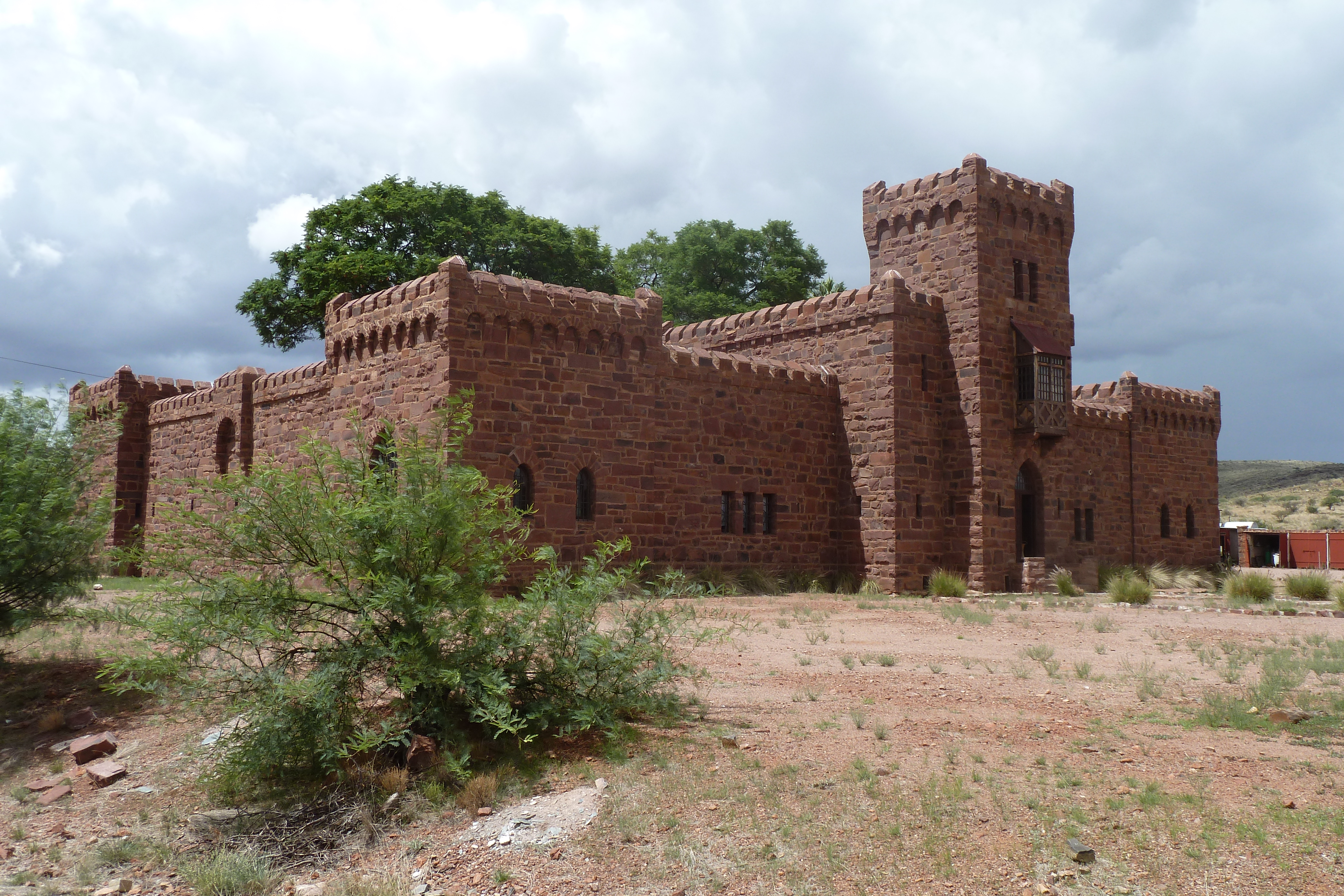
Duwisib Castle built in 1909 to serve as residence for General Hans Heinrich Von Wolf.

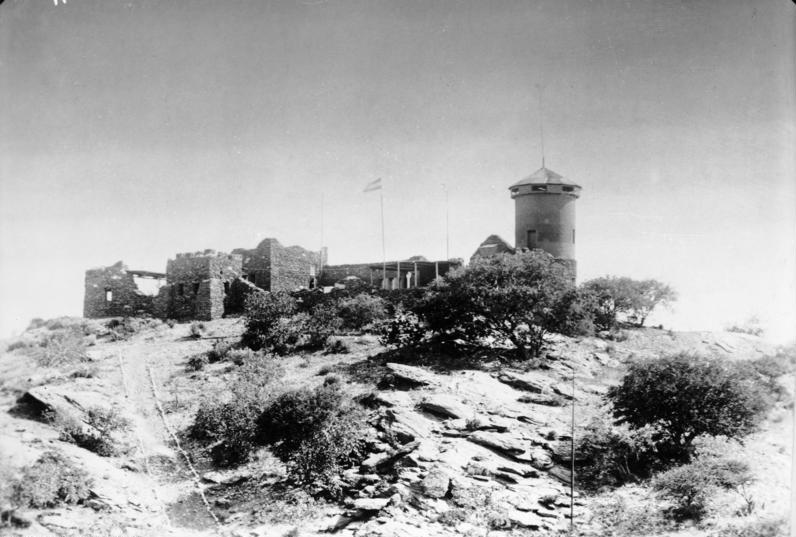
Schwerinsburg Castle in the 1900s. It is currently home to the Italian Ambassador

- Duwisib Castle, Hardap Region (1909)
- Heinitzburg Castle, Windhoek (1914)
- Sanderburg Castle, Windhoek (1917–1919)
- Schwerinsburg Castle, Windhoek(1890–1913)

== Nigeria ==
- Kajuru Castle, Kajuru, Nigeria (1981–1989)

== Senegal ==
- Fort Nassau
- Fort Oranje

== Sierra Leone ==
- Fort Bunce (1670–1840)
- Fort Lomboko (before 1839–1849)
- Fort Tasso (1160–?)
- Fort Thornton (1792)
- Fort York (after 1672 – around 1729)

== Somalia ==
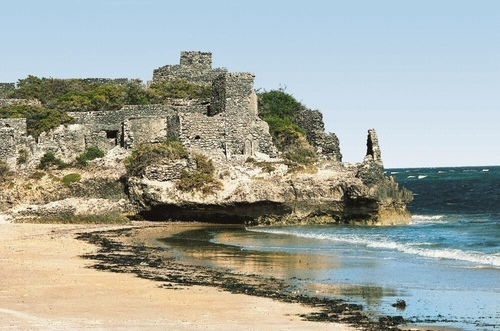
The Citadel of Gondershe, Somalia was an important city in the Medieval Ajuran Empire

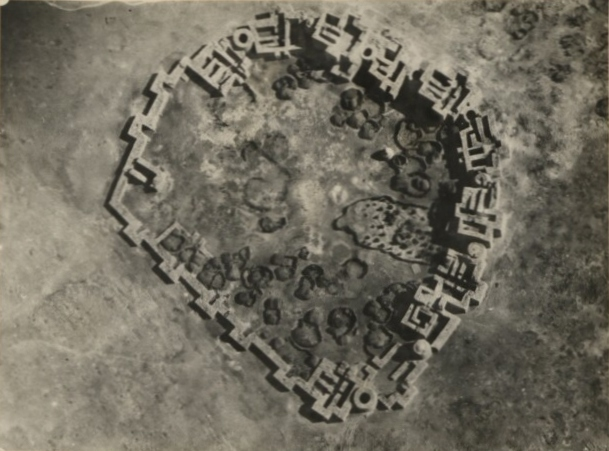
Aerial view of Dhulbahante Garad and Darawiish King Diiriye Guure's main Dhulbahante Garesa (fort) complex in Taleh, Somalia, the capital of his Dervish State

- Castle town of Qandala, Bari, Puntland (no longer existent)
- Citadel ruins of Gondershe, Banaadir, Somalia
- Dhulbahante Garesa, Eyl, Puntland
- Dhulbahante Garesa, Taleh, Sool, Somaliland

== South Africa ==
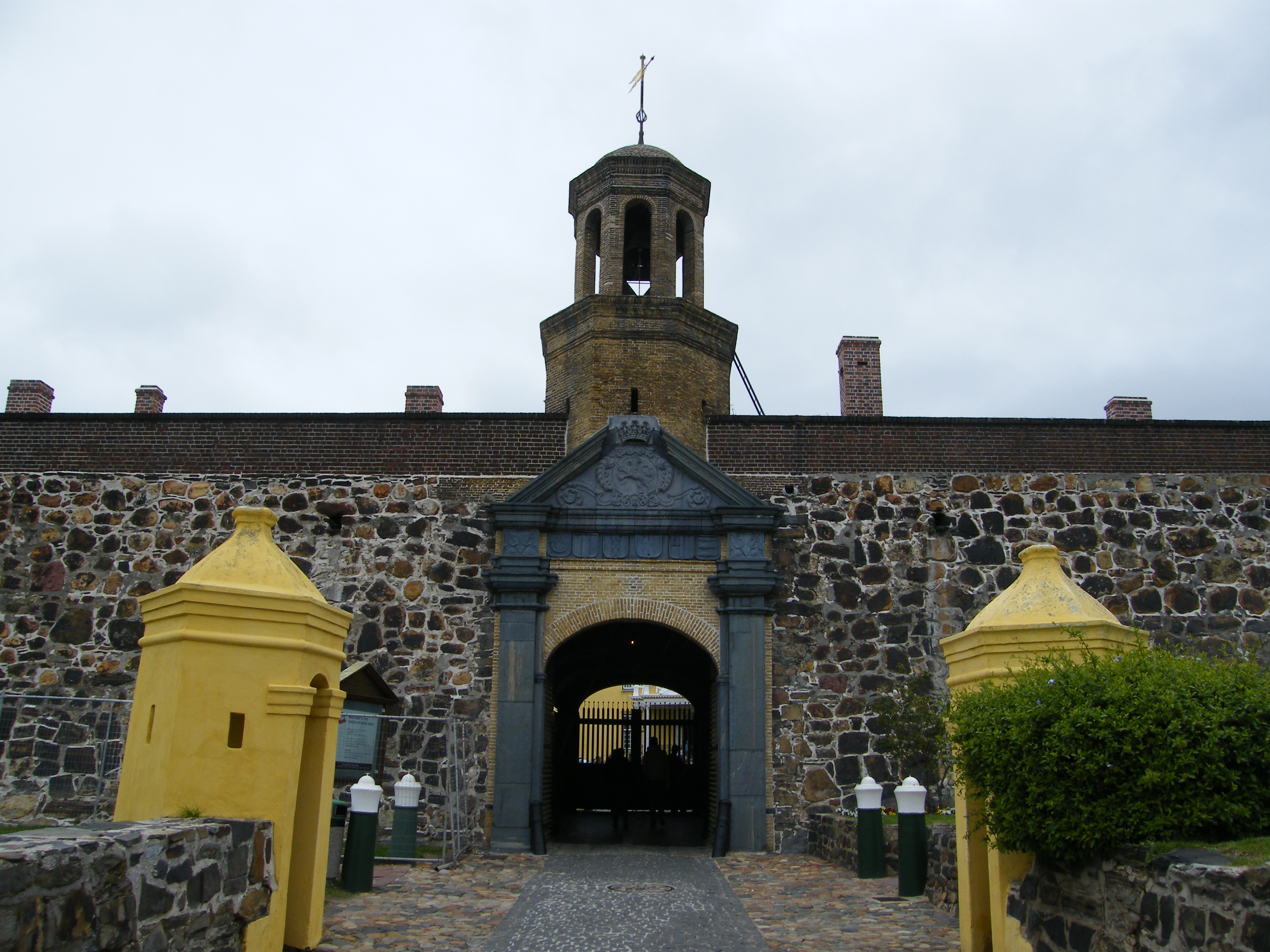
The Castle of Good Hope in Cape Town, built in the 1660s.

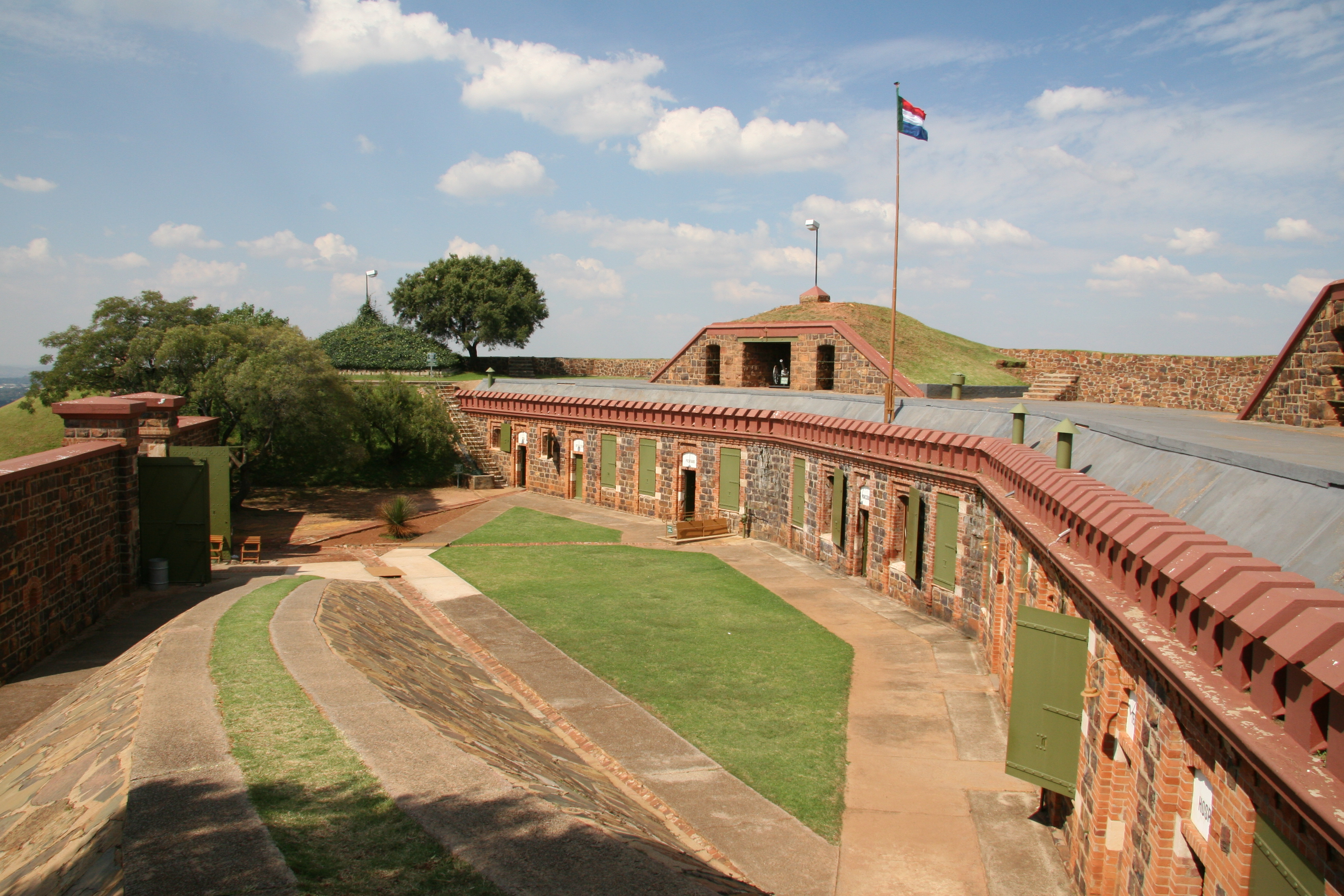
Fort Klapperkop built in the 1890s.

- Amsterdam Battery, Western Cape (1780s)
- Castle Kyalami, Gauteng (1990s)
- Castle of Good Hope, Cape Town (1666)
- Castle on the Cliff, Western Cape (1960s)
- Fort Chavonnes, Western Cape (1714–1725)
- Craighross Castle, Noetzie, Western Cape
- Coornhoop, Western Cape (1657)
- Fort Beaufort, Eastern Cape (1822–1837)
- Fort Daspoortrand, Gauteng(1896–1898)
- Fort Durnford, Estcourt, KwaZulu-Natal (1847)
- Fort Hare, Alice, Eastern Cape (19th century)
- Fort Klapperkop, Pretoria, Gauteng (1890s)
- Fort Mistake, Glencoe, KwaZulu-Natal
- Fort Nongqayi, KwaZulu-Natal (1883)
- Fort Schanskop, Gauteng (1890s)
- Fort Wonderboompoort, Gauteng (1897)
- Greylingstad, Mpumalanga (c. 1900)
- King's Blockhouse, Western Cape (1795)
- Knoetzie Castles, Western Cape (1930s)
- Lindsay Castle, Noetzie, Western Cape
- Lichtenstein Castle, Western Cape (1980s)
- Voortrekker Fort, Mpumalanga (1847)

== Sudan ==
- Buhen (c. 1860 BCE)
- Semna West Fort, Semna (Nubia), (1965–1920 BCE)

== Tanzania ==
- Bagamoyo Fort, Bagamoyo (c. 1860 German colonial fortified building)
- Ikoma Fort, Serengeti National Park (19th century German colonial fort)
- Ngome Kongwe (Old Fort), Stone Town, Zanzibar (c. 1700)
- Old Portuguese fort, Kilwa Kisiwani (c. 1500)

== Tunisia ==
- Borj El Kebir, Djerba island (14th century)
- Borj El Kebir (Mahdia), Mahdia Governorate (16th century)
- Kasbah of Le Kef, Kef Governorate, (c. 1612)
- Kasbah of Sfax (9th-century)
- Kelibia Fort, Kelibia (5th century bc, 16th century)
- Ribat of Monastir, Monastir (c. 796)
- Ribat of Sousse, Sousse (c. 812)

== Zambia ==
- Lundazi Castle, Eastern Province

== Zimbabwe ==
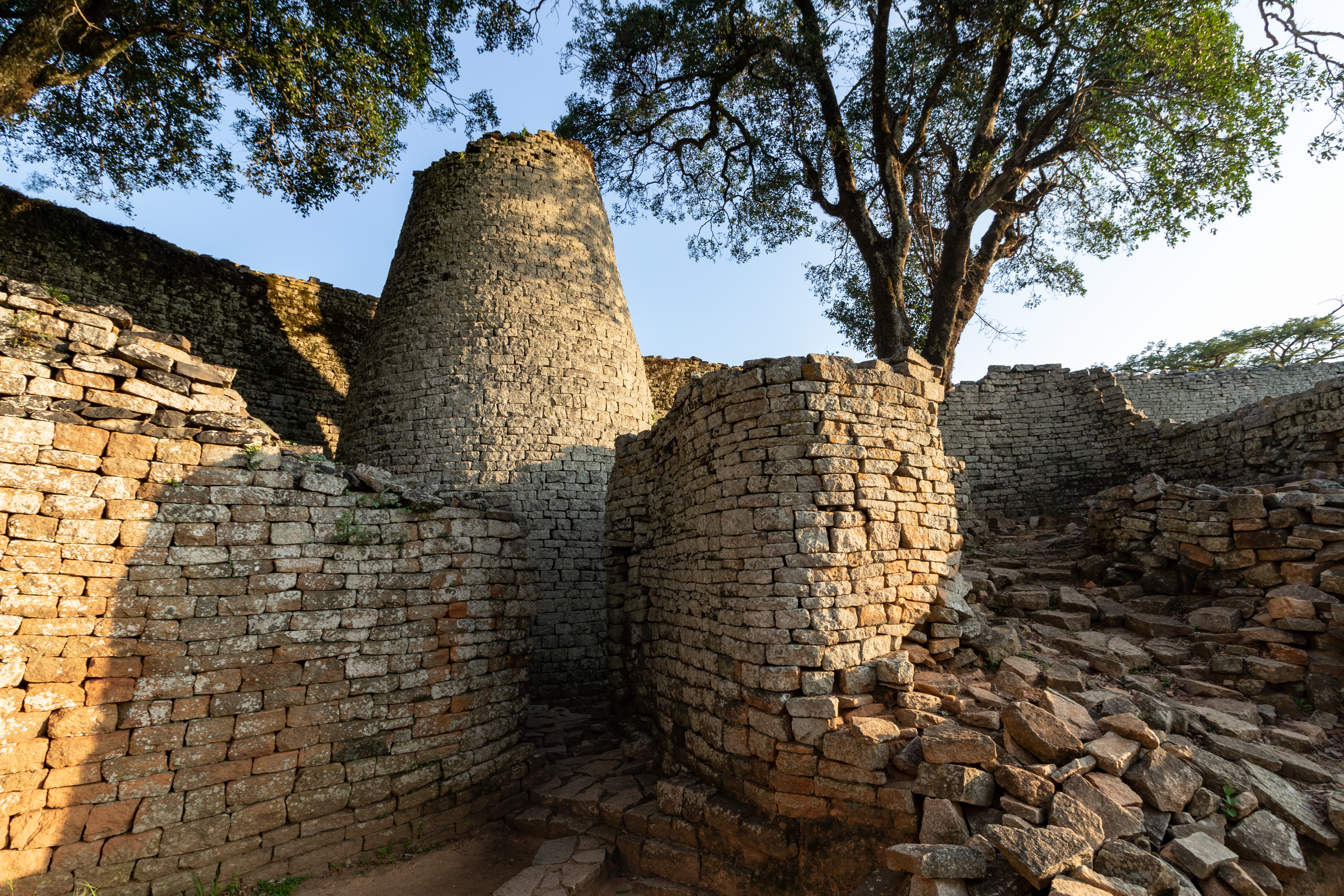
Great Zimbabwe

- Fort Victoria, Masvingo
- Great Zimbabwe (11th–15th century)
- Nesbitt Castle, Bulawayo
