= List of castles in Namibia =

Duwisib Castle Sanderburg Castle Schwerinsburg

This is a list of castles in Namibia.

== Castles ==
Name	Location	Picture
Duwisib Castle	Hardap Region	
Heinitzburg	Windhoek	
Sanderburg	Windhoek	
Schwerinsburg	Windhoek	

== See also ==
- List of castles in Africa
