= Iburu, Nigeria =

Iburu
- Village
- Location within Nigeria
- Coordinates: 10°16′6″N 07°47′20″E
- Country: Nigeria
- State: Kaduna State
- LGA: Zangon Kataf
- District: Kufana
- Time zone: UTC+01:00 (WAT)
- Postal code: 800106
- Climate: Aw

Iburu is a village community in Kufana district of Kajuru Local Government Area, southern Kaduna state in the Middle Belt region of Nigeria. Iburu and the wider Kajuru LGA have experienced security challenges, including |attacks and abductions by bandits. The postal code for the village is 800106. The area has an altitude of about 2322 feet or 707 meters. The nearest airport to the community is the Yakubu Gowon Airport, Jos.

== Hamlets ==
Iburu is a village area of Kajuru Local Government Area that consist of other populated area such as;

1. Afogo
2. Buda
3. Idon
4. Kajuru
5. Kallah
6. Kasuwan Magani
7. Kufana
8. Maro
9. Rimau
10. Tantattu

== See also ==
- Atyap chiefdom
- List of villages in Kaduna State
