= ZSZ =

ZSZ may refer to:

- Swakopmund railway station (IATA code), in Swakopmund, Namibia
- Zdob și Zdub, a Moldovan ska punk band
