= Idon =

Idon may refer to:

- iDon, an album by Don Omar
- Idon, Nigeria, a town
- Idon language, a Nigerian language
