= Duwisib Castle =

Castle in Namibia

Coordinates: 25°15′11″S 16°32′02″E

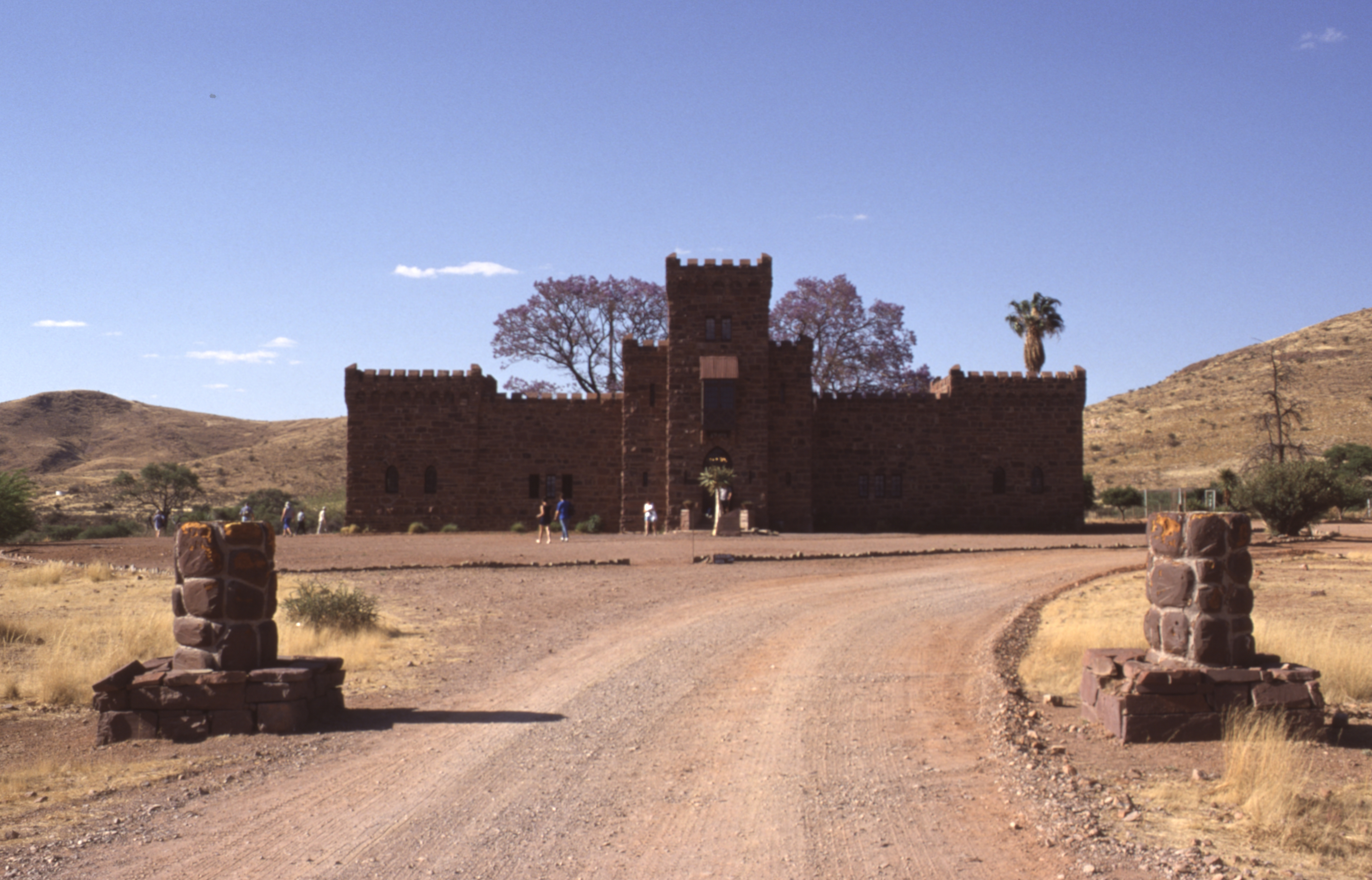
- Duwisib Castle
- Location: Namibia

Duwisib Castle, sometimes spelt Duwiseb or Duweseb, is a grand pseudo-medieval looking fortress in the hills of the semi-arid Southern Namib region of Namibia, 72 km southwest of Maltahöhe, Hardap Region. It was built in 1909 to serve as the residence of Hans Heinrich von Wolf, a German military officer. Since 1979 the castle has been owned by the government.

== History ==
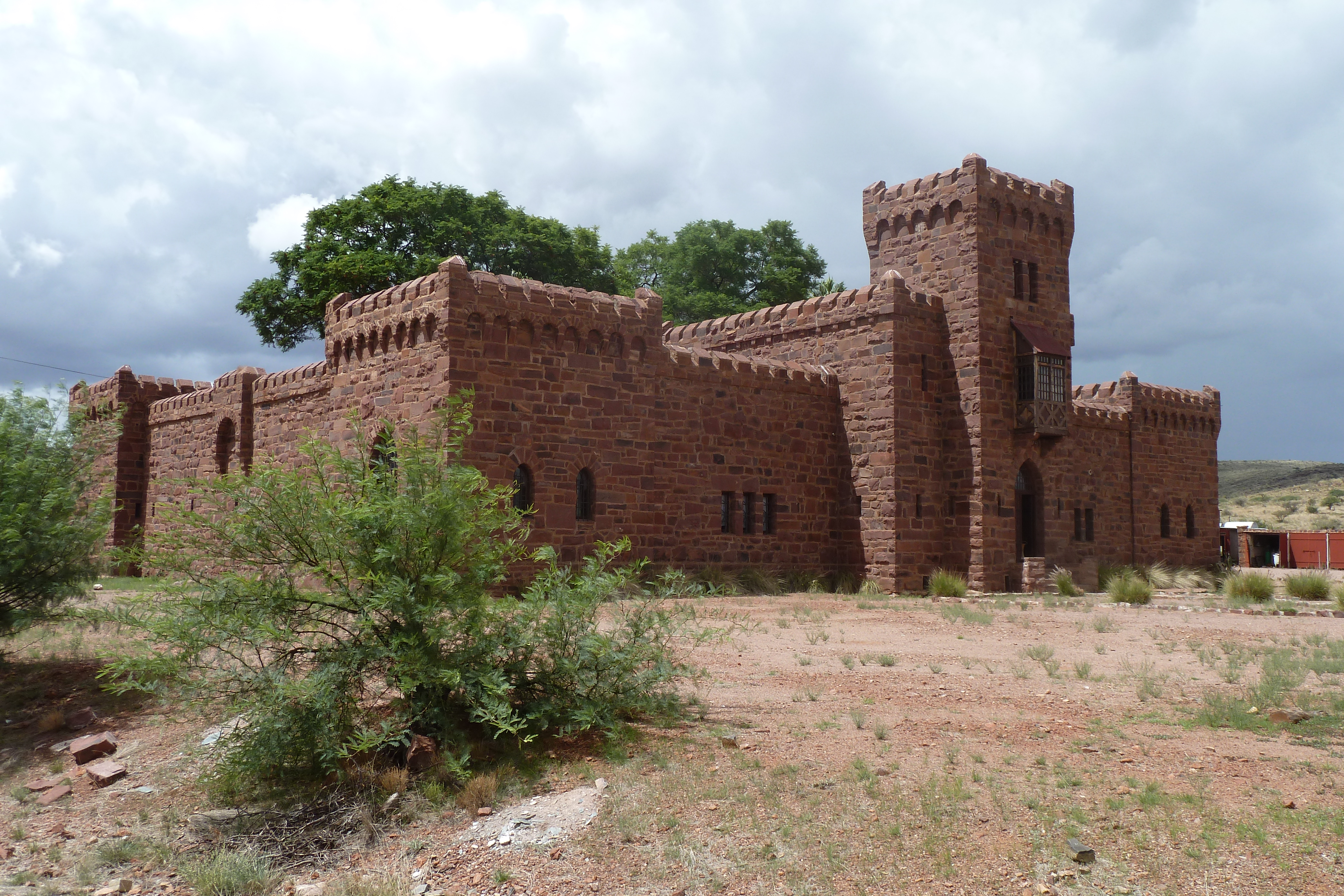
Duwisib Castle

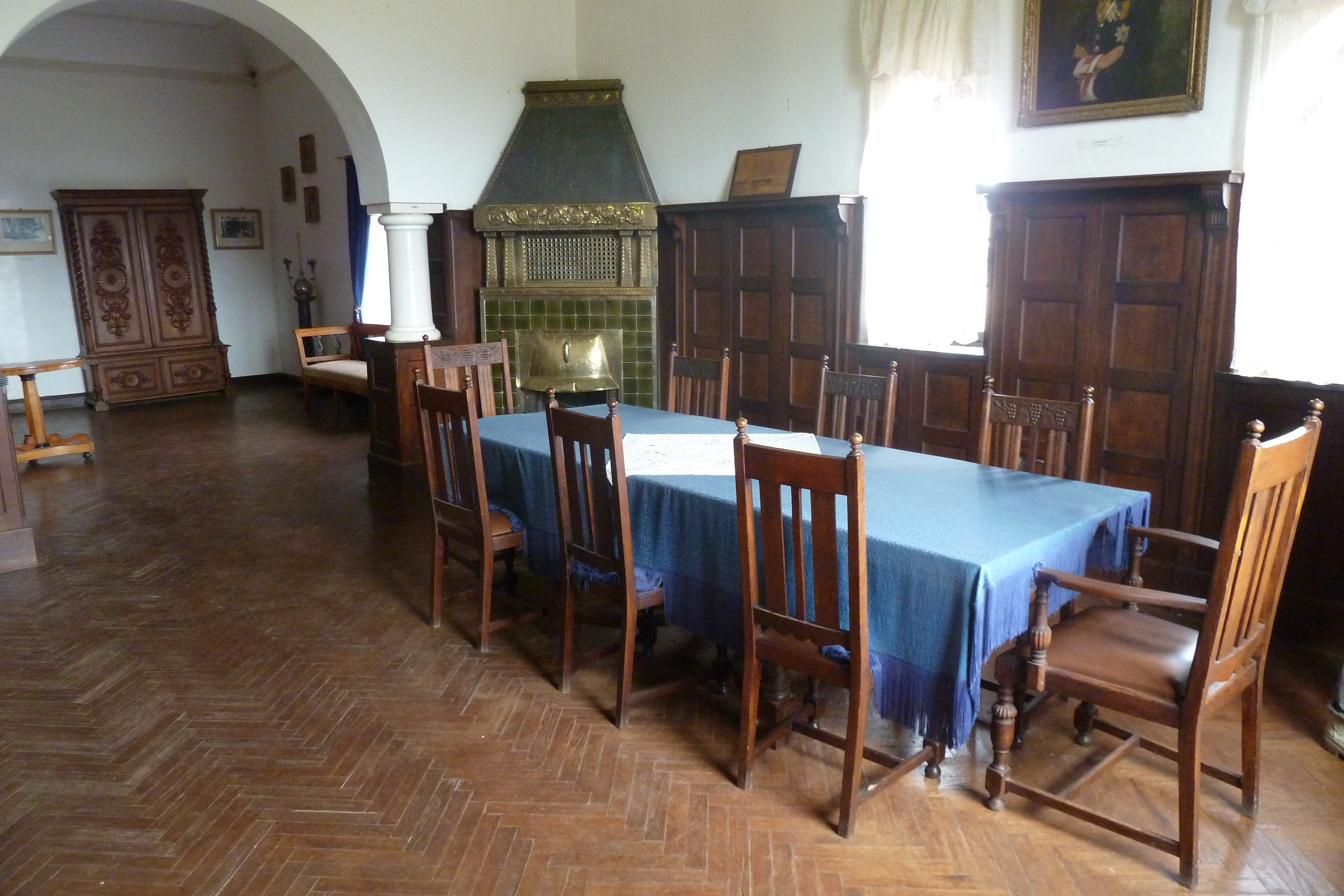
The dining room

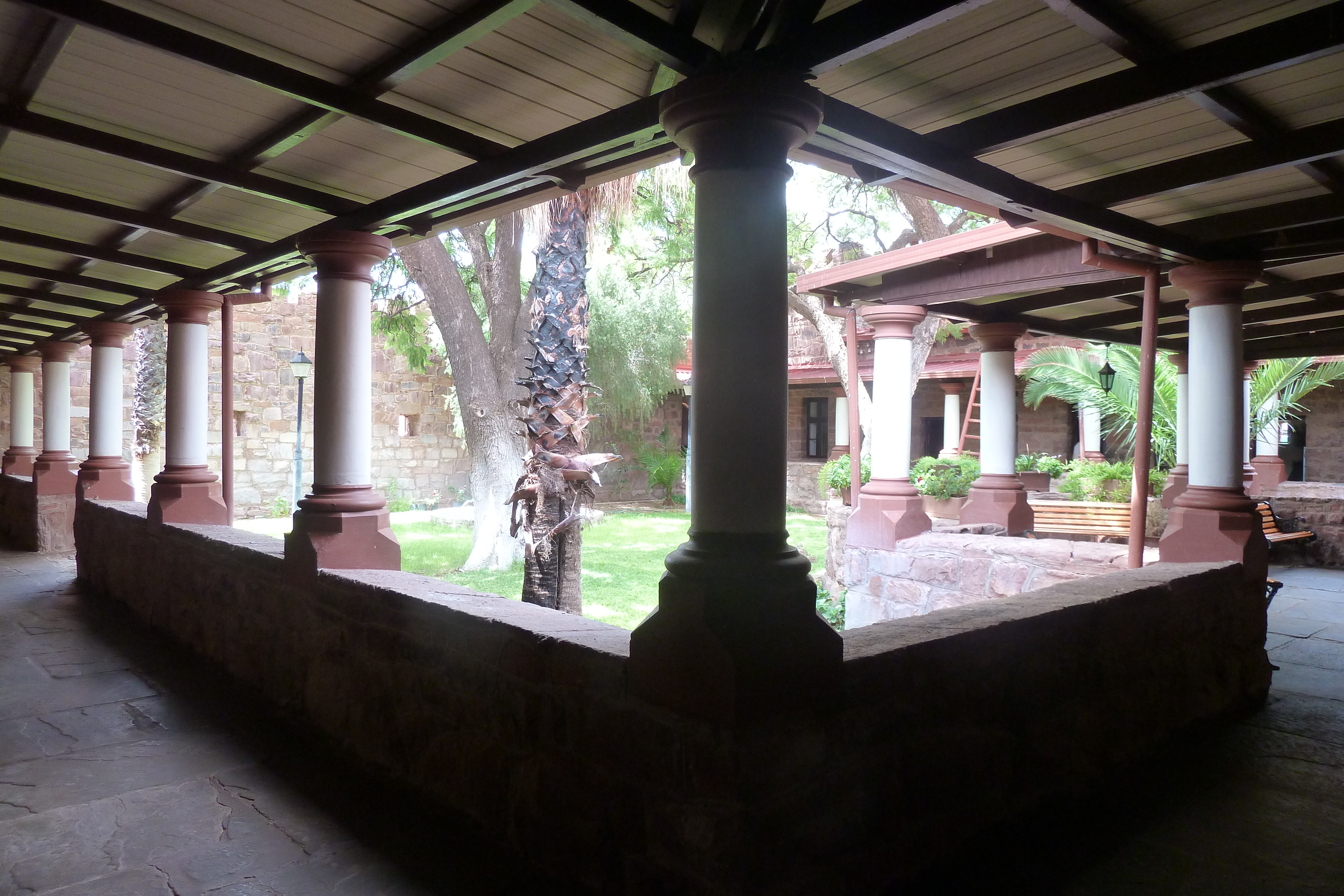
The courtyard design is apparently inspired by the cloisters of Western monasteries

Duwisib was built by 'Baron' Captain Hans Heinrich von Wolf (born in Dresden, September 11, 1873), a Saxon artillery officer following in the footsteps of his father Ernst (an officer in the Royal Saxon Army) who served in Königsbrück and was posted to (then) German South-West Africa as member of the Schutztruppe. After the German-Nama war Captain von Wolf went home and married the stepdaughter of the US consul, Miss Jayta Humphreys (1881-1963), on 8 April 1907. They decided to settle in German South-West Africa and bought eight farms in the Maltahöhe area covering 20,000 hectares, to which they added another 35,000 hectares in 1910, operating the property as a stud farm for English and Australian thoroughbred horses.

Eminent architect Wilhelm Sander was commissioned to design a building and construction commenced in 1908. It was hoped that the castle would bear a resemblance to some of the existing German forts in Namibia, some of which are situated in Windhoek, like the Schwerinsburg, Sanderburg, and Heinitzburg castles and the administrative offices known as the Tintenpalast (now the national legislative building). Red sandstone was obtained locally but most materials such as iron, wood, cement, and lamps were imported from Germany, first by sea through the port of Lüderitz and then hauled 300 km from the coast on wagons drawn by 24 oxen through the Namib. Artisans were hired from around Europe, including bricklayers from Italy and carpenters from Sweden and Ireland. The Von Wolfs lived in a hut with their coachman and their Herero servant during the grueling construction process. While the servants were involved in maintenance, the Von Wolfs participated avidly, Hans Heinrich planting the courtyard with palm trees. The resulting edifice consisted of 22 rooms and included furnishings both bought at a castle auction and imported (a massive German oak cabinet and Turkish bamboo tables). The mid-1909 inauguration was attended by major South-West African dignitaries.

While they were travelling to Europe in 1914, the First World War broke out and the ship carrying Von Wolf and his wife was diverted to Rio de Janeiro. Jayta Humphreys had retained her American citizenship and found passage to Europe on a Dutch ship; legend has it the Baron had to travel disguised as a woman. On arrival in Europe the Baron rejoined the German army, and was killed at the Battle of the Somme in 1916, just two weeks after signing up. His wife could not bring herself to return to Namibia alone and never again laid claim to the castle. She stayed on the coast of the Tegernmeer in Bavaria (since her stepfather had been appointed consul general in Munich), before settling in the late 1930s in Zurich, where she met and married Erich Schlemmer, the consul general of Siam.

After the Von Wolfs left South Africa, their friend Max, Count von Lüttichau was given executorship of the farm, but it declared bankruptcy shortly after World War I, and since the South African government paid no compensation for this or several other wartime raids, the house was sold for £7,500 to the Swedish Murrman family. The new owner died shortly after his arrival and his son was killed in World War II, after which the castle was sold for £25,000 to the private company Duwisib Pty Ltd. The rest of the land was divided and sold off. Jayta returned to the US to stay with her parents in Summit, New Jersey. Several changes in ownership later, the castle was acquired by the government in 1979 and extensively refurbished in 1991.

== Present status ==
What are said to be descendants of their horses can be seen today roaming free and wild as Namib Desert Horses along the roadside and in the restricted diamond areas, although whether this is the true origin of these herds, is not accurately known. The property is currently under the management of Namibia Wildlife Resorts. Visitors can tour the castle and even stay overnight in a refurbished bedroom within the castle since its renovation in 2014.
