= Kajuru Castle =

Modern castle in Nigeria

Coordinates: 10°18′45.29″N 7°40′45.55″E

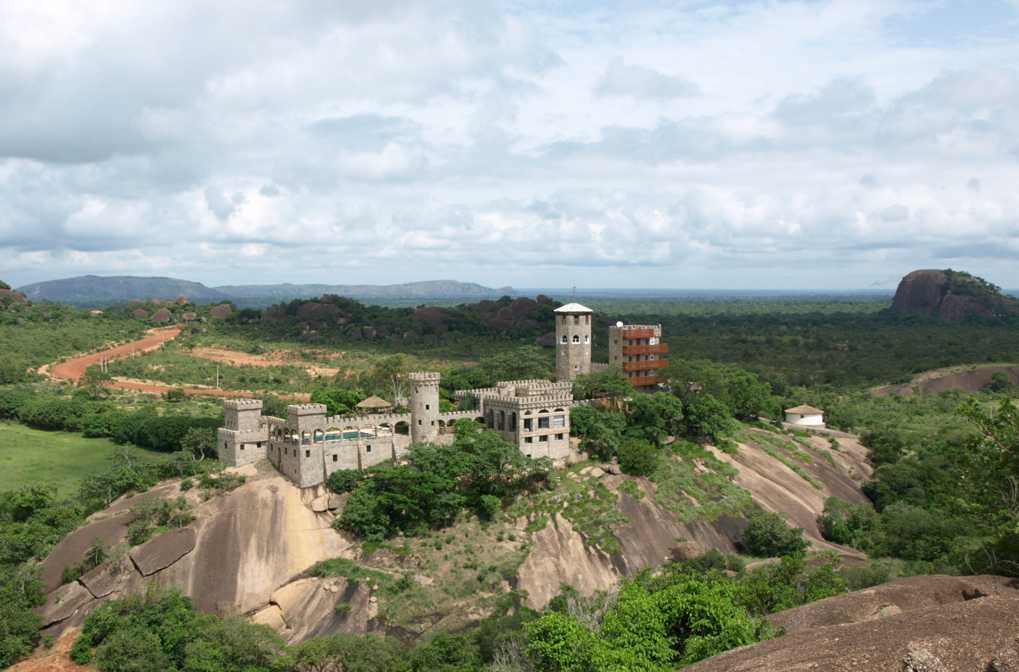
View of Kajuru Castle

Kajuru Castle is a luxury villa, built between the years 1981 and 1989, at Kajuru (Ajure) village in southern Kaduna State, Nigeria. It was built by a German expatriate in Nigeria, living in Kaduna at the time.

The castle is located at about 45 km from Kaduna on a mountaintop in Kajuru (Ajure) village, Kaduna State. Built with 1 meter thick granite stone in a fanciful medieval-inspired Romanesque style, it is adorned with turrets, an armory and a dungeon.

The castle is privately owned, and has the capacity to host 150 guests.

== Architecture ==
The castle is often described as an African version of the Bavarian Castle in a grand 19th-century Romanesque revival style. It has a baronial styled hall, coupled with dungeons and towers lined with crenellated walls. The castle also has a large “knight’s hall” and a landlord (masters) residence and several other rooms over its three floors.

== Incidents ==
On 19 April 2019, unidentified terrorists armed with heavy weapons broke into the castle, killing two people, a British communication specialist and a Nigerian assistant for NGO company Mercy Corps. The unidentified terrorists also kidnapped three others.

Later on, the kidnapped hostages were released after an intervention by the Nigerian police.

== See also ==
- List of castles in Africa
