= Wilhelm Sander =

German architect (1860–1930)

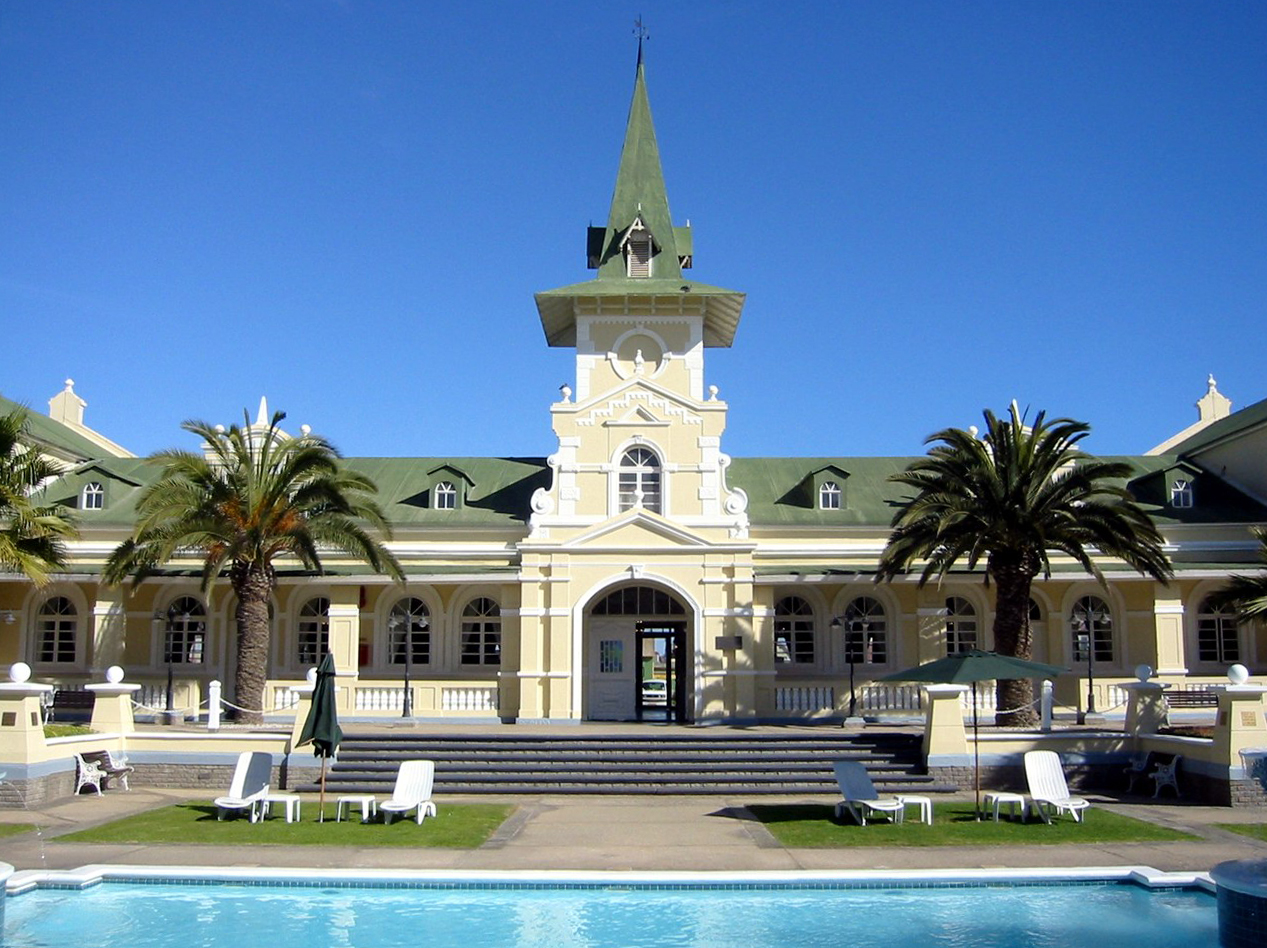
Former station building of Swakopmund, now serving as a hotel, one of Sanders' first works in German South West Africa.

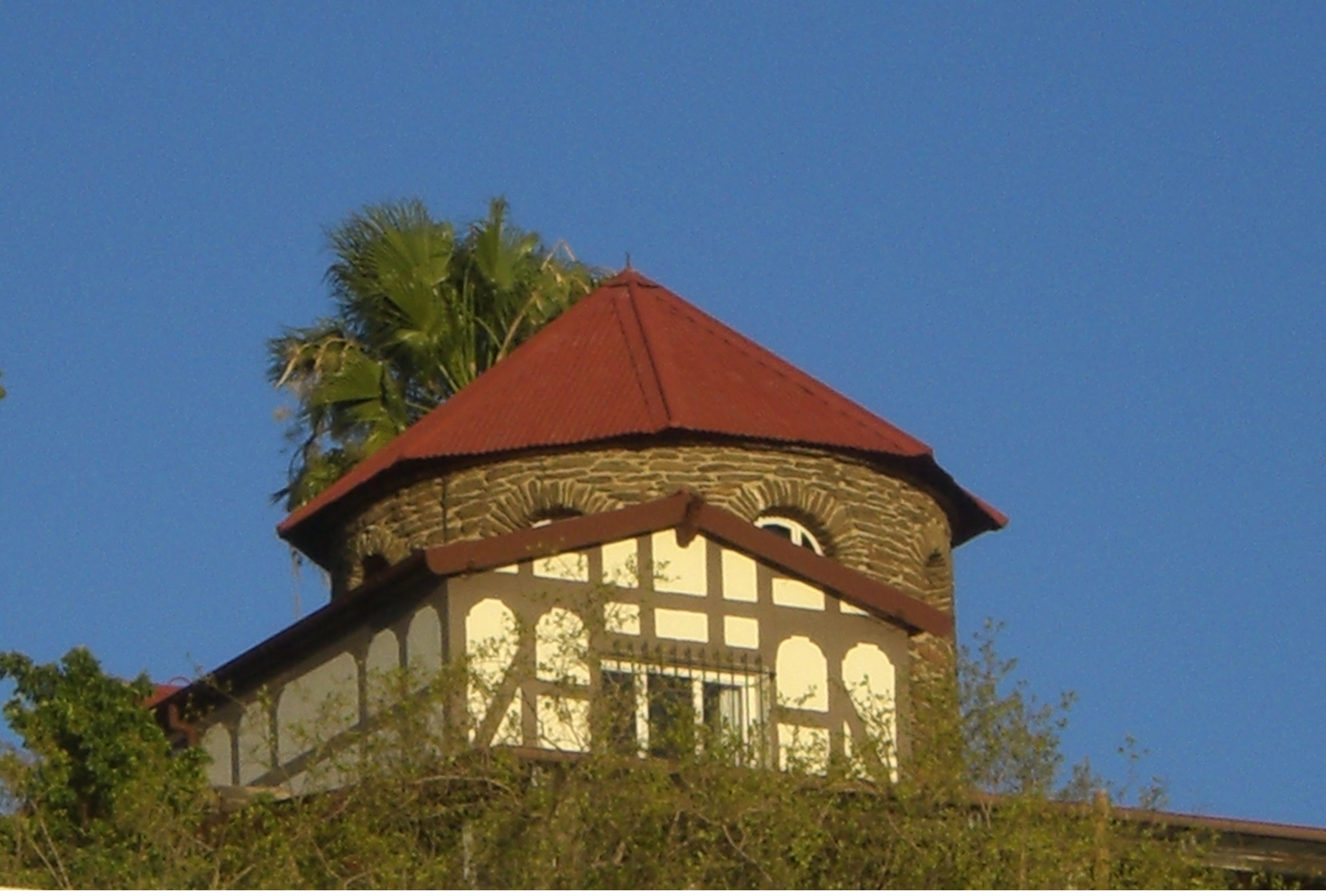
Sanderburg in central Windhoek, a small castle Wilhelm Sander designed for himself

Wilhelm Sander (10 December 1860, in Berlin – 22 November 1930, in Lüderitz) was a master architect and contractor working for Sander & Kock known for his work in German South West Africa, today's Namibia.

Sander studied Civil engineering in Höxter, Germany. He worked in Berlin before joining the German Colonial Society for South West Africa and repatriating to German South West Africa in 1901.

One of his first works were the Swakopmund Railway Station, built in 1901, and the Swakopmund Lighthouse (1902). Also in Windhoek, his buildings today are all famous landmarks. The three castles of Windhoek, Heinitzburg, Schwerinsburg and Sanderburg, are what he is best known for here but he also built the Gathemann and Erkrath buildings and was involved in the erection of the Tintenpalast. Sander also designed Duwisib Castle near Helmeringhausen, the German Lutheran church in Keetmanshoop, and many others.

Wilhelm Sander was married twice: 1910 to Paola née Eck and 1921 to Else née Fröbel. He moved to Lüderitz in 1922, where he stayed until his death in 1930.
