= Swakopmund railway station =

Railway station in Namibia

Coordinates: 22°40′25″S 14°32′7″E

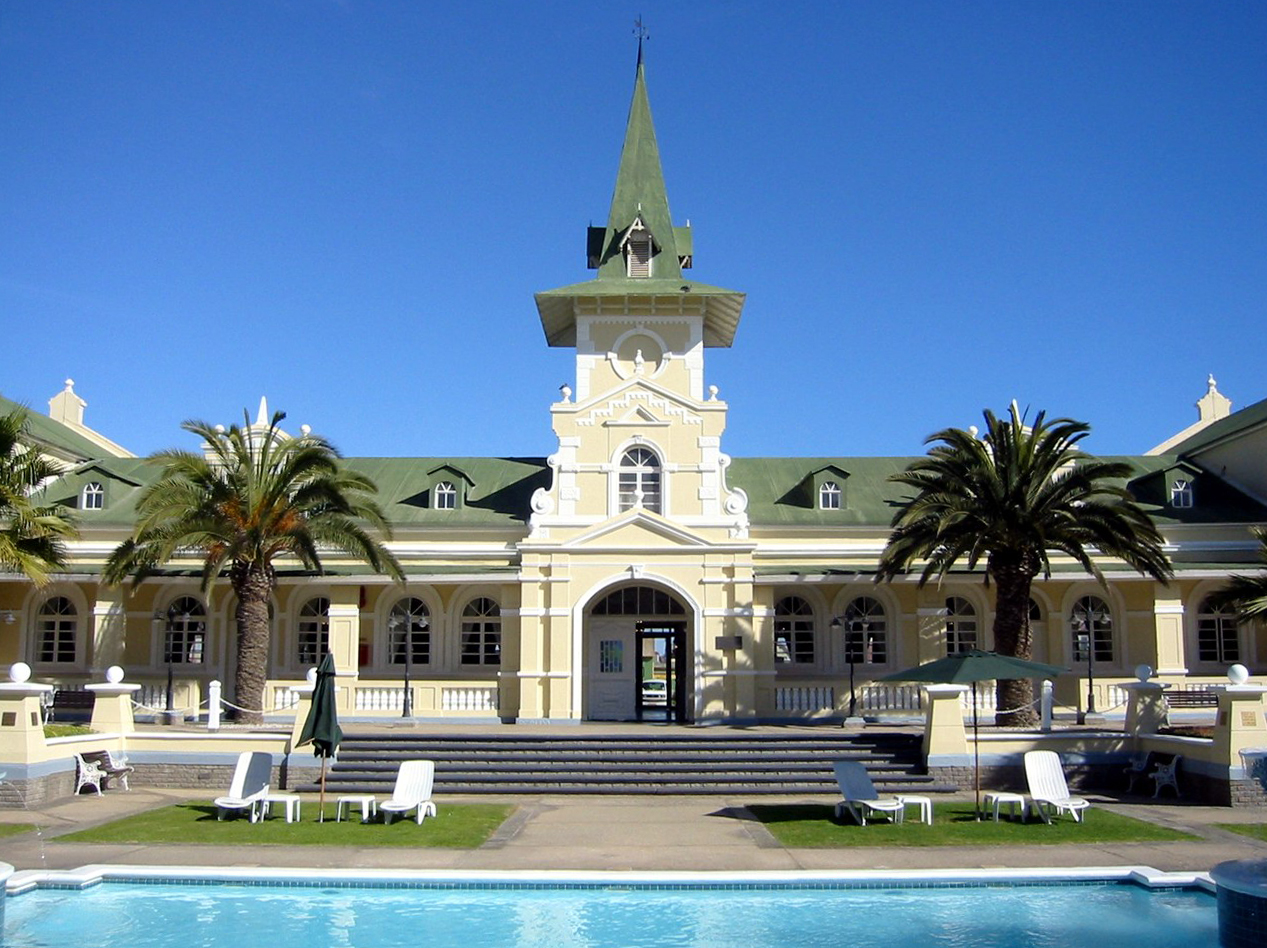
Former station building of Swakopmund, now serving as a hotel.

Swakopmund railway station (German: Bahnhof Swakopmund) is a railway station serving the town of Swakopmund in Namibia. It is part of the TransNamib railway network. Its IATA code is ZSZ.

== Overview ==
Swakopmund was the starting point of the first state railway line in German South West Africa. The railway station was built in 1901, as a terminal on the Imperial Germany's colonial Kaiserliche Eisenbahn line connecting Swakopmund with the capital Windhoek. The station was designed by Willi Sander, who also later designed Swakopmund Lighthouse. In 1914 the extension to Walvis Bay was completed, with a railtrack very close to the shore of the Atlantic Ocean. In 1980 this extension was replaced by an alternative route behind the dunes that allowed for higher axle load.

The station building, declared a national monument in 1972, today serves as a hotel and casino; nowadays trains stop further inland to the east of the original building. There is another former station building in Swakopmund, the O.M.E.G. Bahnhof of the private mining company Otavi Minen und Eisenbahn Gesellschaft, today housing a museum.

== See also ==
- Rail transport in Namibia
