= Kelibia Fort =

Coordinates: 36°51′N 11°06′E

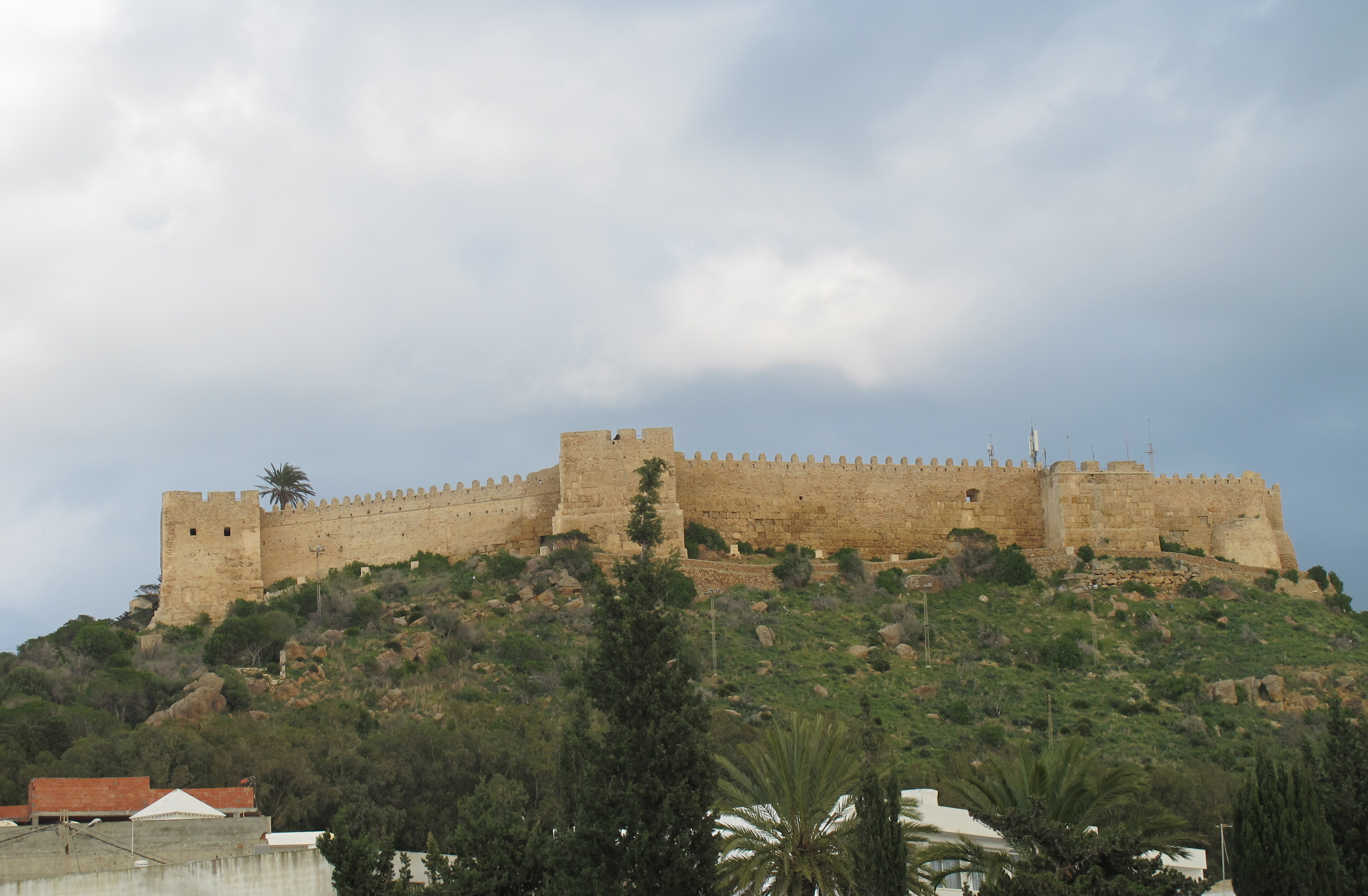
- General view of the fort

- Location within Tunisia

General information
- Location: City of Kelibia, Tunisia
- Construction started: 16th century

Technical details
- Structural system: Citadel

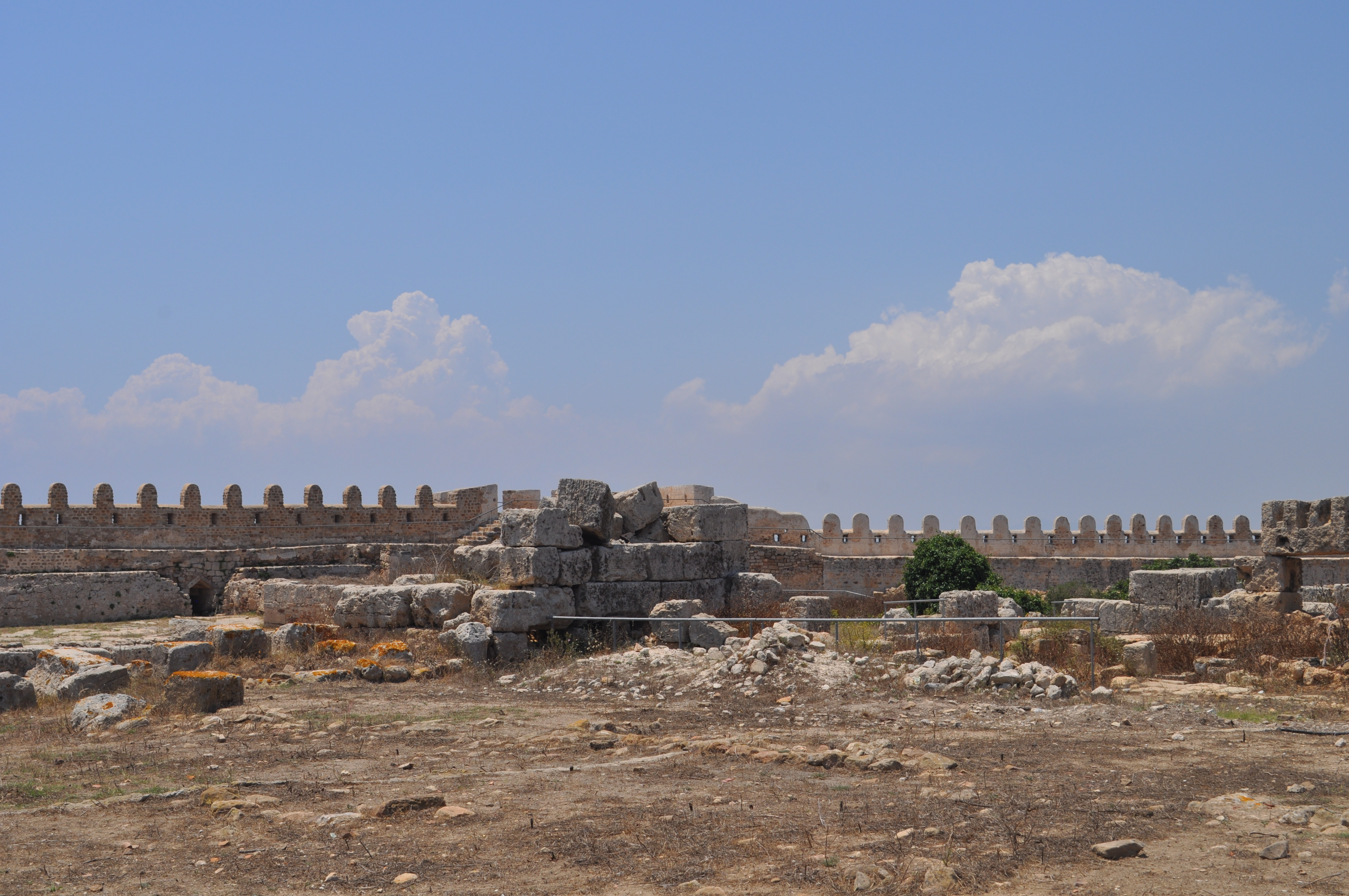
The interior of Kelibia Fort

Kelibia Fort is a citadel built in the sixteenth century, situated on a rocky promontory 150 meters high overlooking the Mediterranean Sea and the city of Kélibia in the Governorate of Nabeul, on the northeast coast of the Tunisian peninsula of Cap Bon.
