= Kelibia =

- Location within Tunisia
- Coordinates: 36°51′0″N 11°6′0″E
- Country: Tunisia
- Governorates: Nabeul Governorate

Government
  - Mayor: None

Population (2022)
  - Total: 62,993
- Time zone: UTC+1 (CET)
  - Summer (DST): UTC+2 (CEST)
- Website: www.commune-kelibia.gov.tn

Kelibia (Kélibia) (Arabic: قليبية Qlībiya), often referred to as Klibia or Gallipia by European writers, is a coastal town on the Cap Bon peninsula, Nabeul Governorate in the far north-eastern part of Tunisia. Its sand beaches are considered some of the finest in the Mediterranean.

== History ==
Known in Roman times as Clypia or Clypea, (Ancient Greek: Κλυπέα) the town was founded by the Carthaginians as the fortified town of Aspis (Ancient Greek: Ἀσπίς) in the 5th century BC. The Siege of Aspis in 255 BC was the first battle of the First Punic War fought on African soil.

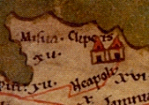
Kelibia, Cape Bon as shown on the 4th century Roman Map, Tabula Peutingeriana.

Clypea was also the seat of an ancient Christian bishopric.

At the Council of Carthage (411), which brought together Catholic and Donatist bishops, Clypea was represented by Bishop Leodicius and the Donatist Geminius. Aurilius was one of the bishops whom the Arian Vandal king Huneric summoned to Carthage in 484 and then exiled. Two other bishops of Clypia took part in the Council of Carthage (525) (Bishop Crescentius) and Council of Carthage (645) (Bishop Stephanus).

No longer a residential bishopric, Clypea is now listed by the Catholic Church as a titular see.

== Sports ==
The town's Kelibia Olympic Club, founded in 1957 and active since 1959, is one of the best Tunisian volleyball clubs. The club has won two Tunisian championship titles (in 1977 and 2003), eight cups (1972, 1974, 1975, 1976, 1978, 1989, 2004 and 2011) and an Arab Cup of clubs' champions (in 1998).

== Culture ==
The old church of Kélibia is part of the city’s cultural complex. A building housing a cultural center and a movie theater was constructed in its garden.

Archaeological excavations have also uncovered an ancient synagogue, evidence of an early Jewish presence in the region, identified in particular by its mosaic flooring.

Since 1964, Kélibia has hosted the Kelibia International Amateur Film Festival, the oldest of its kind in the country.

== Kelibia today ==
The main landmark of Kelibia is the recently restored Kelibia Fort overlooking the harbor. Kelibia is a fishing port and is home to Tunisia's National Fishing School. The town has a population of 52,000 (2014 census).

The 'Muscat de Kélibia', a fruity regional white wine is widely recognized as one of the best of the country.

== Climate ==
Climate data for Kelibia (1981–2010, extremes 1968–2021)
Month	Jan	Feb	Mar	Apr	May	Jun	Jul	Aug	Sep	Oct	Nov	Dec	Year
Record high °C (°F)	23.7 (74.7)	25.3 (77.5)	30.9 (87.6)	32.9 (91.2)	33.0 (91.4)	42.0 (107.6)	40.2 (104.4)	42.0 (107.6)	38.4 (101.1)	33.2 (91.8)	29.6 (85.3)	28.2 (82.8)	42.0 (107.6)
Mean daily maximum °C (°F)	15.6 (60.1)	15.7 (60.3)	17.3 (63.1)	19.3 (66.7)	22.8 (73.0)	27.0 (80.6)	30.1 (86.2)	31.0 (87.8)	28.2 (82.8)	24.8 (76.6)	20.4 (68.7)	16.9 (62.4)	22.4 (72.3)
Daily mean °C (°F)	11.9 (53.4)	11.9 (53.4)	13.1 (55.6)	15.2 (59.4)	18.6 (65.5)	22.4 (72.3)	25.4 (77.7)	26.2 (79.2)	23.9 (75.0)	20.9 (69.6)	16.5 (61.7)	13.2 (55.8)	18.3 (64.9)
Mean daily minimum °C (°F)	8.8 (47.8)	8.6 (47.5)	9.9 (49.8)	11.8 (53.2)	15.0 (59.0)	18.5 (65.3)	21.4 (70.5)	22.4 (72.3)	20.6 (69.1)	17.8 (64.0)	13.4 (56.1)	10.0 (50.0)	14.9 (58.8)
Record low °C (°F)	0.3 (32.5)	0.9 (33.6)	3.1 (37.6)	4.5 (40.1)	7.6 (45.7)	11.0 (51.8)	9.4 (48.9)	15.5 (59.9)	8.3 (46.9)	2.2 (36.0)	4.0 (39.2)	0.4 (32.7)	0.3 (32.5)
Average precipitation mm (inches)	83.3 (3.28)	62.6 (2.46)	50.1 (1.97)	36.3 (1.43)	22.0 (0.87)	6.7 (0.26)	5.1 (0.20)	3.8 (0.15)	45.4 (1.79)	79.9 (3.15)	74.8 (2.94)	90.0 (3.54)	560.0 (22.05)
Average precipitation days (≥ 1.0 mm)	9.0	7.9	7.5	5.5	2.9	1.4	0.5	1.0	4.1	6.5	7.6	8.8	62.7
Average relative humidity (%)	76	76	76	75	75	72	71	73	74	75	75	76	75
Mean monthly sunshine hours	169.4	177.5	219.7	243.1	296.7	327.9	358.8	330.1	250.3	219.4	181.4	158.7	2,933
Source: Institut National de la Météorologie (precipitation days/humidity 1961–1990, sun 1981-2010) (Note: The Station ID for Kelibia is 12827211.)

== Twin towns – sister cities ==
- Almuñécar, Spain
- Marsala, Italy
- Pantelleria, Italy
