= Kajuru =

Kajuru Ajure
- LGA and town
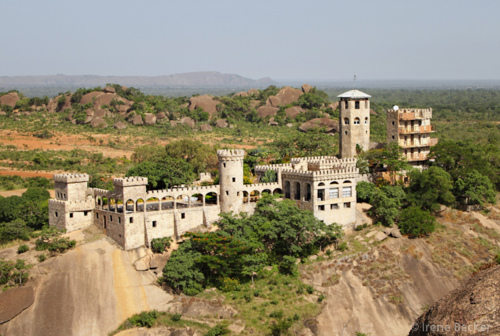
- Kajuru Castle
- Interactive map of Kajuru
- Coordinates: 9°30′N 7°42′E
- Country: Nigeria
- State: Kaduna State

Government
  - Emir: Alhassan Adamu
  - Chairman: Hon. Dauda Madaki

Area
  - Total: 2,229 km^{2} (861 sq mi)

Population (2006)
  - Total: 109,810
  - Density: 66.48/km^{2} (172.2/sq mi)
- Time zone: UTC+1 (WAT)
- Postal code: 800
- ISO 3166 code: NG.KD.KJ

Kajuru (Adara: Ajure) is a town and local government area in southern Kaduna State, Nigeria. The local government is located on longitude 9° 59'N and 10° 55'N and latitude 7° 34'E and 8° 13'E, with an area of 2,229 km^{2}.

== History ==
It was carved out of Chikun Local Government Area in March 1997 by the military administration of Gen. Sani Abacha's regime. At creation, it was made up of two traditional districts, Kajuru and Kufana. Additional districts were created, bringing the number to 14 districts (Toro 2001), now 10.

== Boundaries ==
Kajuru Local government area (LGA) shares boundaries with Igabi LGA to the north, Chikun LGA to the west, Kauru LGA to the east, Zangon Kataf LGA and Kachia LGA to the southwest and south, respectively.

== Administrative subdivisions ==
Kajuru Local Government Area consists of 10 subdivisions (second-order administrative divisions), namely:

1. Afogo
2. Buda
3. Idon
4. Kajuru
5. Kallah
6. Kasuwan Magani
7. Kufana
8. Maro
9. Rimau
10. Tantattu

== Population ==
Kajuru (Ajure) Local Government Area has an estimated population of 109,810 people according to the 2006 national population census. Its population was projected by the National Population Commission of Nigeria and National Bureau of Statistics to be 148,200 by March 21, 2016.

== People ==
The major ethnic group is the Adara. The Adara people are otherwise known as Kadara by the Hausa.

Others include the Gbagyi and settler elements such as the Hausa, Fulani, Yoruba, Ikulu, and Igbo, amongst others from the various parts of the state and country.

== Religion ==
The three main religions in the country, Christianity, Islam and Traditional African Religion, are practiced in the area.

== Climate ==
According to the Köppen's classification of climate, Kajuru local government belongs to the Aw which is marked by distinct wet and dry season. The most important climatic variables in the study area include temperature, rainfall and relative humidity.

=== Temperature ===
The study area experiences high temperature all year round, which is a characteristic of the tropics. The mean daily temperature in the area can be as high as 34 °C between months of March and May. Temperature could be as low as 20 °C during December to January. This low temperature is intensified by humidity due to the dry harmattan wind. The hottest month in Kajuru is April, with an average high temperature of 34 °C (93 °F) and low temperature of 21 °C (70 °F). The cool season lasts for 3.3 months, from June 25 to October 4, with an average daily high temperature below 28 °C (83 °F). December is the coldest month in Kajuru, with an average low temperature of 13 °C (56 °F) and high of 30 °C (86 °F). The hot season lasts for 2.2 months, from February 13 to April 20, with an average daily high temperature above 33 °C (92 °F).

=== Rainfall and relative humidity ===
The study area has two seasons as earlier mentioned. These two seasons are determined by two prevailing air masses blowing over the area at different periods during the year.

One of the air masses is the north easterlies, which is a continental air mass that sets in from the month of November and lasts to early march. During this period, precipitation is very low or absent. The air mass is dry and dust-laden.

The second air mass is the south westerlies, which begins to set in from late march and ends around the month of October. During this period, precipitation and humidity are very high and rainfall exceeds 1,300 mm (51 in) a year. The maximum rainfall is experienced in the month of August; during this time, rainfall is usually very heavy with thunderstorms.

The relative humidity ranges between 65% and 70% in the rainy season and between 18% and 38% in the dry season.

== Relief and drainage ==
The area is part of the extension plains of northern Nigeria. The general relief of the area is fairly plain, with isolated rock outcrops of inselbergs found in the area, thus creating undulations. The inselbergs are granitic in origin, formed from underlaid basement complex rocks. Depressions are found along the water courses where streams occur.

The study area is drained by a network of streams that find their source mostly in the isolated hilly areas found around. It is drained by R. Rimau, R. Iri, R. kKutura.

== Geology and soil ==
The area under study is found on the extensive crystalline basement complex of northern Nigeria. The basement complex rocks are intrusive igneous rocks which have been in existence since the Precambrian time.

According to Food and Agricultural Organisation (F.A.O) soil classification, Kajuru local government area is made up of ferruginous tropical soil which is derived from intensive weathering and granitisation of the basement, which itself comprises mostly migmatites, gneiss, granite and schist. These soils are generally well drained and mostly sandy-loam and loamy soil in plains, while in the valleys there are deposits of hydromorphic soils, which occupy the flood plains of the rivers. The soils in the area are rich in mineral content and therefore support the high agricultural productivity in the area.

== Vegetation ==
Kajuru local government area belongs to the northern Nigeria-Guinea savannah zone based on vegetation classification. The vegetation here suffers from anthropogenic disturbance through cutting down of trees for fuel wood, cultivation, and construction works. Also animal grazing is very high, coupled with seasonal bush burning which is prominent during the dry season. The vegetation has been reduced to grasses, shrubs and parkland; few tall trees are found, mostly along water courses.

The parkland trees are found in the open cultivated land, with shrubs found almost everywhere except areas where cultivation is being practiced. Common trees found in the area include Isoberlinia doka, African locust bean, gao tree, African mahogany, mango, and several others.

There is also large expense of green grasses especially during the wet season. This supports large population of cattle and other herbivorous animals during the wet season. The common grass species are Albazia zygia, Tridax procumbens, and Landolphia spp among others. During the rainy season the grasses are green but turn brownish during the dry season.

== Economic activities ==
Kajuru is an agrarian based economy with agriculture as its major economic activity, which serves as the bedrock of other activities. These activities include food and cash crop production, livestock rearing, poultry trading and crafts making.

The major system of farming practiced is the subsistence farming by peasant farmers, with few people invested in commercial farming which produces large quantity of agricultural products. A little dry season farming is practiced in the area by people living close to the rivers. Tomatoes, pepper, vegetables, onions, okra and sugar-cane are grown in the Fadama areas. These additional products attract traders from surrounding urban centres like Kachia, Kafanchan and Kaduna town, thereby constituting a major source of income.

Animal rearing is also an important occupation which is carried out in a form of subsistence mixed farming, apart from among the Fulani in the area who depend largely on cattle rearing. These animals supply organic manure to farm lands, provide income and also are used for consumption. Animals such as cattle, goats, pigs, sheep and poultry are the predominant animals reared in the area. Trading activities also form another vital occupation that combines both agricultural and non-agricultural commodities made from crafts.

== Attractions and buildings ==
The Kajuru Castle is situated in Kajuru LGA.

== See also ==
- 2019 Kaduna State massacre
- Kajuru Castle
