= Idon, Nigeria =

Town in Kaduna State, Nigeria

Idon Idong
- Town
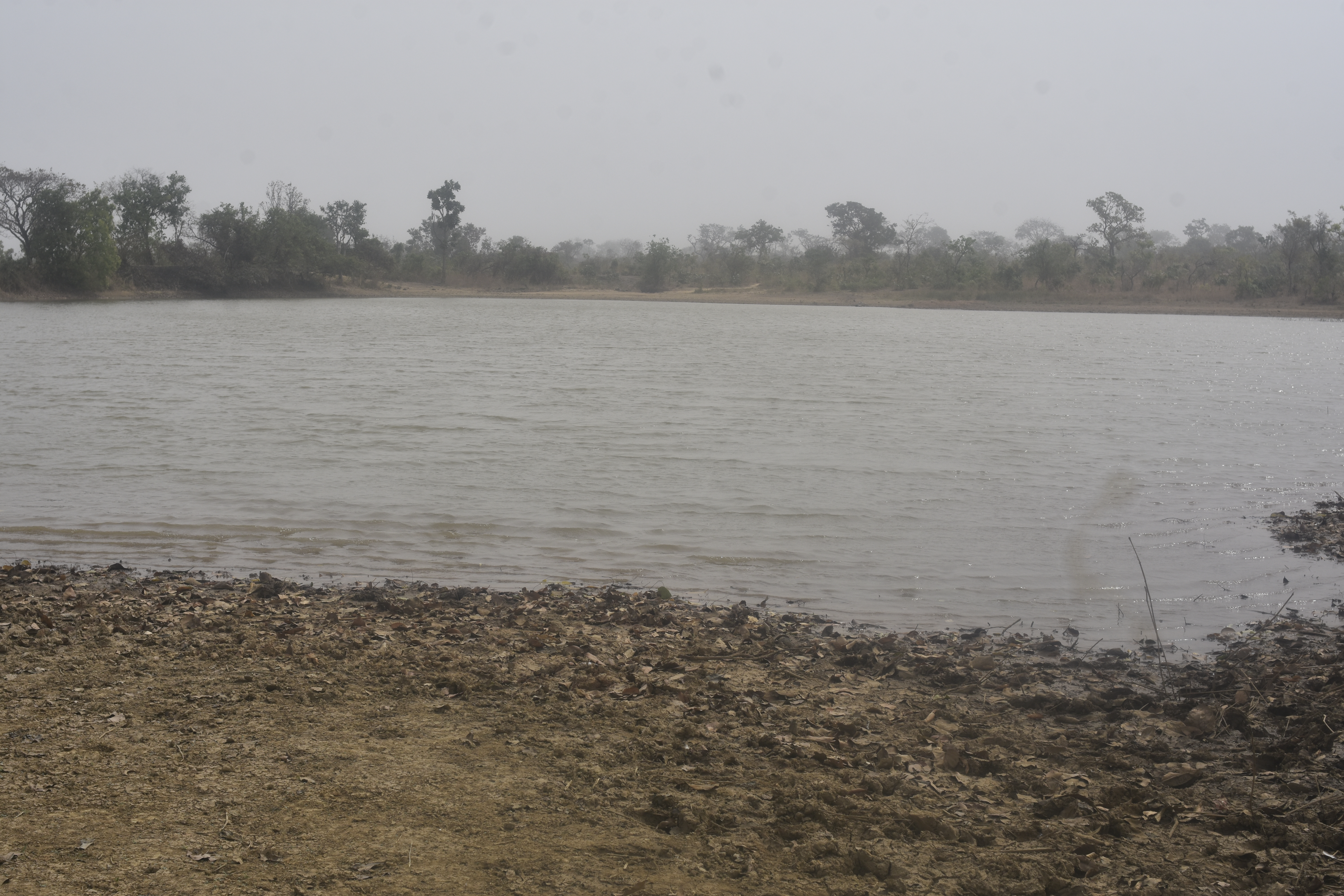
- A large pond in Idon, along Idon-Kachia road

- Location within Nigeria
- Coordinates: 10°06′N 07°54′E
- Country: Nigeria
- State: Kaduna State
- Time zone: UTC+01:00 (WAT)
- Postal code: 800
- Climate: Aw

Idon is a town in Kajuru Local Government Area, southern Kaduna State, Middle Belt, Nigeria. The postal code of the area is 800. It is about 69 km away from the state capital, Kaduna.

== Transport ==
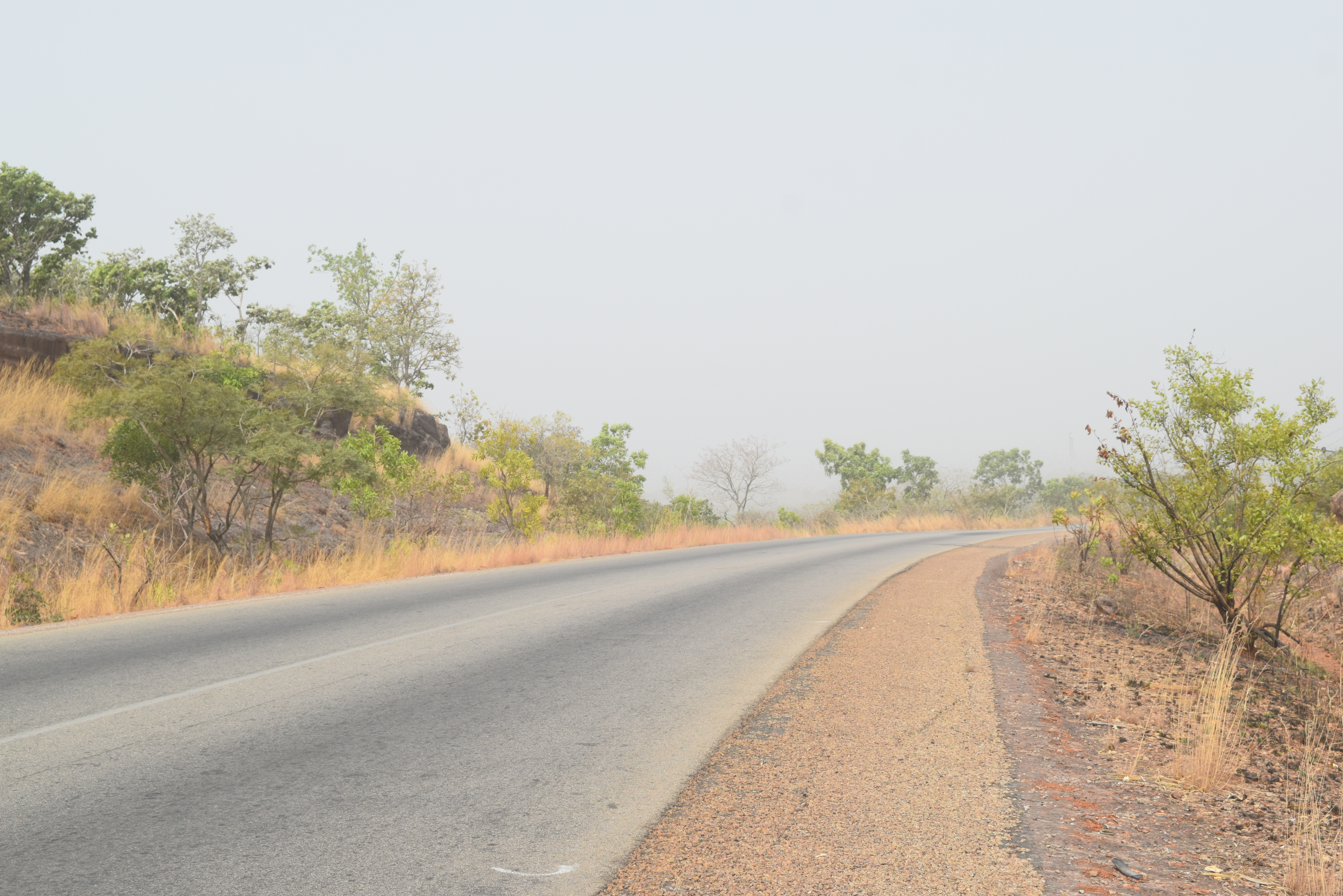
Idon-Kachia Road

=== Railway ===
Idon is served by a nearby station on a cross-country branch line of the national railway network.

== See also ==
- Railway stations in Nigeria
