= Schwerinsburg =

Castle in Namibia

Coordinates: 22°34′24″S 17°05′33″E

- Windhoek, Namibia
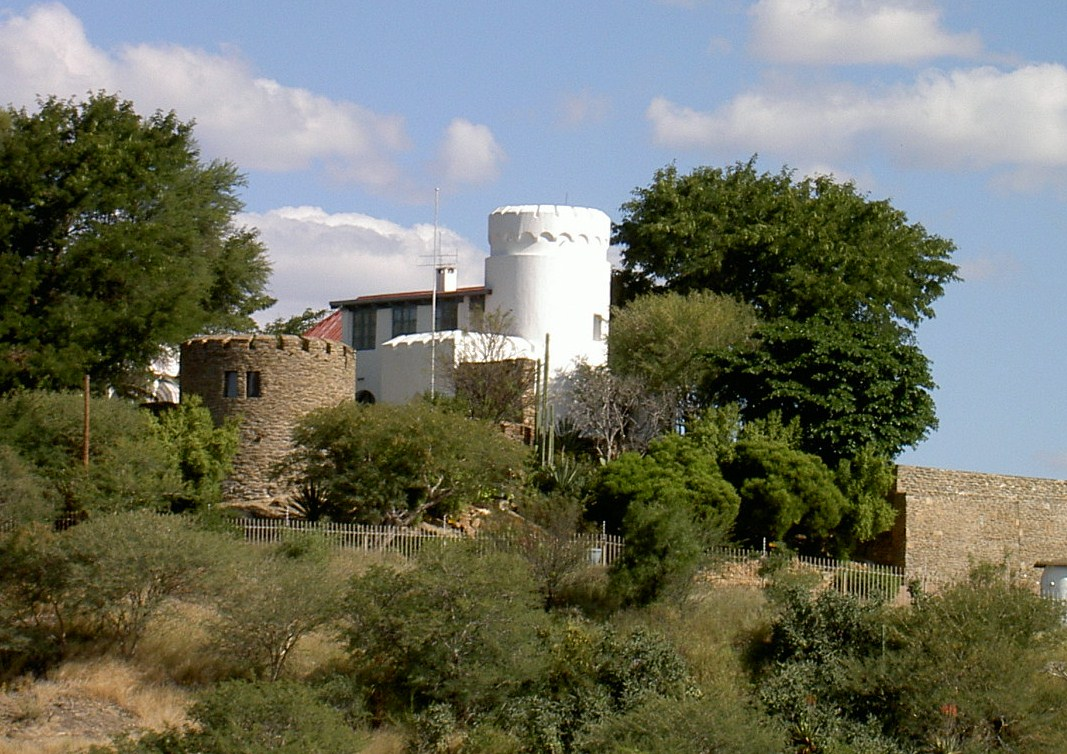
- Schwerinsburg

Site information
- Type: Hilltop castle
- Owner: Private
- Condition: Intact

Site history
- Built: 1890 — 1913
- Built by: Wilhelm Sander
- In use: Embassy

Schwerinsburg ('Schwerin's castle') is the biggest of three castles in Windhoek, Namibia. Today it is the private residence of the Italian ambassador in Namibia.

== History ==
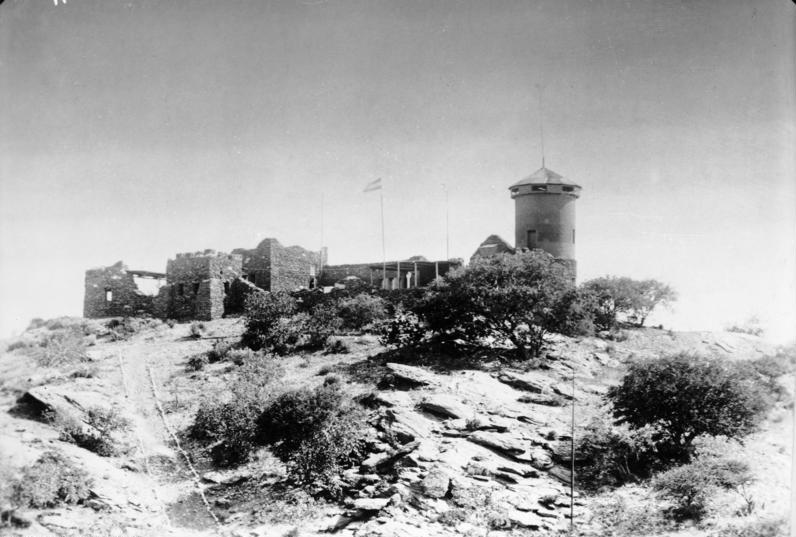
Sperlingslust castle at the beginning of the 20th century

During the time of the construction of Alte Feste in 1890, the tower of Schwerinsburg was built by Curt von François, commissioner of German South-West Africa. In 1904, Schutztruppe (the German colonial forces) sold it to architect Wilhelm Sander who converted it into a beer garden and named it Sperlingslust (lit. 'Sparrows' delight').

In 1913, Hans Bogislav Graf von Schwerin, governor of the Gobabis District of German South-West Africa, bought Sperlingslust from Sander and engaged him to convert it into a castle. It was later named Schwerinsburg after the new owner. Today it is the private residence of the Italian ambassador in Namibia.

== See also ==
- Heinitzburg
- Sanderburg
