= Sanderburg =

Castle in Namibia

Coordinates: 22°34′28″S 17°05′33″E

- Windhoek, Namibia
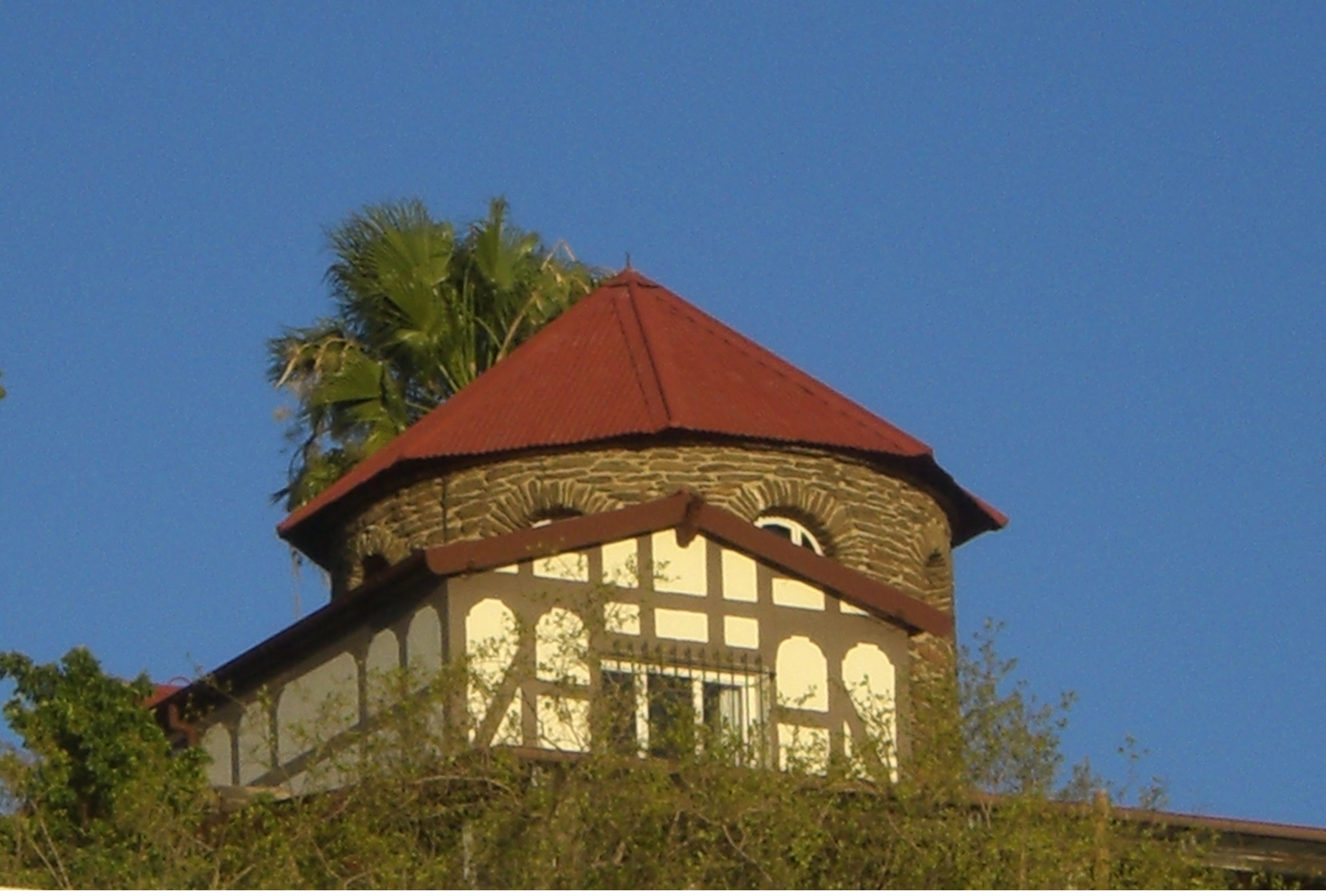
- Sanderburg

Site information
- Type: Slope castle
- Owner: Private
- Condition: Intact

Site history
- Built: 1917 — 1919
- Built by: Wilhelm Sander
- In use: Private residence

Sanderburg (Sander's castle) is the smallest of three castles in Windhoek, Namibia. It was built between 1917 and 1919 by architect Wilhelm Sander who designed it as his own place of residence. Its architectural style combines several medieval features.

== See also ==
- Heinitzburg
- Schwerinsburg
