= Heinitzburg =

Castle in Namibia

Coordinates: 22°34′28″S 17°05′33″E

- Windhoek, Namibia
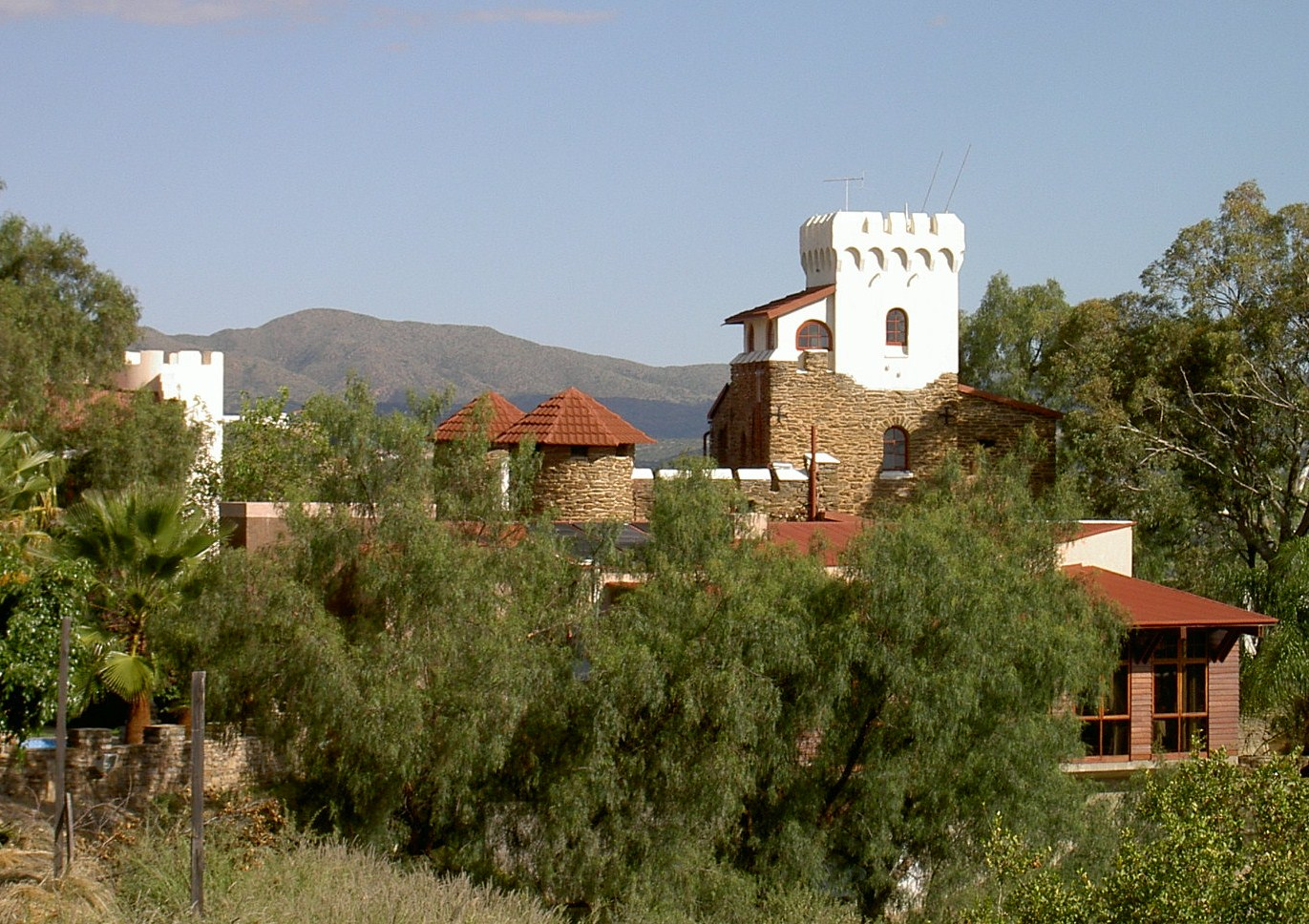
- Heinitzburg

Site information
- Type: Hilltop castle
- Owner: Private
- Condition: Intact

Site history
- Built: 1914
- Built by: Wilhelm Sander
- In use: Hotel and restaurant

Heinitzburg (originally Heynitzburg, Heinitz' castle) is one of the three castles in Windhoek, Namibia. It was built in 1914 by architect Wilhelm Sander.

Sander originally built the castle for himself but sold it in 1916 to Hans Bogislav Graf von Schwerin, who named the castle Heynitzburg after his wife Margarete's birth name "von Heynitz".

Heinitzburg is used today as a restaurant and hotel. The hotel is a member of the Relais & Chateaux group, a global consortium of individually owned and operated luxury hotels.

== See also ==
- Sanderburg
- Schwerinsburg
